= List of Jungian psychologists =

Psychologists associated with analytical psychology

The following is a list of clinicians and academics, both past and present, known for their association with analytical psychology. This school of psychology is based on the writings and practices of Carl Jung.

== A ==
- Gerhard Adler
- Michael Anderton

== B ==
[top]
- Cary Baynes
- Helton Godwin Baynes
- Brewster Yale Beach
- John Beebe
- Ean Begg
- Edward Armstrong Bennet
- Ernst Bernhard
- Pam Blackwell
- Jean Shinoda Bolen
- Vincenzo Bumbalo

== C ==
[top]
- Irene Claremont de Castillejo
- Wallace Clift
- Hugh Crichton-Miller

== D ==
[top]
- John P. Dourley
- Avis M. Dry

== E ==
[top]
- Edward F. Edinger
- Michael Edwards
- Clarissa Pinkola Estés

== F ==
[top]
- Linda Fierz-David
- Tirzah Firestone
- Frieda Fordham
- Michael Fordham
- Marie-Louise von Franz

== G ==
[top]
- Wolfgang Giegerich
- Ingaret Giffard
- Rosemary Gordon
- Adolf Guggenbühl-Craig

== H ==
[top]
- Barbara Hannah
- Mary Esther Harding
- Joseph L. Henderson
- Vera von der Heydt
- Gustav Heyer
- James Hillman
- Beatrice M. Hinkle
- James Hollis
- David Holt
- Judith Hubback

== J ==
[top]
- Jolande Jacobi
- Aniela Jaffé
- Robert A. Johnson
- Carl Jung
- Emma Jung

== K ==
[top]
- Hayao Kawai
- Tina Keller-Jenny
- Antoni Kępiński

== L ==
[top]
- John Layard

== M ==
[top]
- Kristine Mann
- Clifford Mayes
- Kevin F. McCready
- Carl Alfred Meier
- Jill Mellick
- Arnold Mindell
- Maria Moltzer
- Robert L. Moore
- Thomas Moore
- Wendy Mulford

== N ==
[top]
- Erich Neumann

== O ==
[top]
- V. Walter Odajnyk

== P ==
[top]
- Fiann Paul
- Sylvia Brinton Perera
- Linda Pritzker
- Ira Progoff

== R ==
[top]
- J. W. T. Redfearn
- David H. Rosen
- Winifred Rushforth
- Joel Ryce-Menuhin

== S ==
[top]
- Andrew Samuels
- John A. Sanford
- Florida Scott-Maxwell
- Nise da Silveira
- June Singer
- Celestine Smith
- Hester McFarland Solomon
- Anthony Stevens
- Anthony Storr

== U ==
[top]
- Ann Belford Ulanov

== V ==
[top]
- Salley Vickers

== W ==
[top]
- Frances G. Wickes
- Toni Wolff
- Marion Woodman

== Y ==
[top]
- Polly Young-Eisendrath
- Jonathan Young

== Z ==
[top]
- Beverley Zabriskie
- Louis Zinkin

== Bibliography ==
- Casement, Ann, ed. (2007). Who Owns Jung?. Karnac. ISBN 978-1855754034.
- Nagel, Claudia (2020). "Analytical Psychology". In Leeming, David A. (ed.). Encyclopedia of Psychology and Religion (3rd ed.). Springer. pp. 70–75. ISBN 978-3030243470.
- Samuels, Andrew (1985). Jung and the Post-Jungians. Routledge. ISBN 978-0710208644.
- Stevens, Anthony (2001). Jung: A Very Short Introduction. Oxford University Press. ISBN 978-0192854582.
