= Koseki Aquila Raphael =

Japanese producer

Koseki Aquila Raphael (小関章ラファエル, born in Chiba Prefecture, Japan) is a Japanese producer, story architect and Jungian scholar. In 1998, he was baptized by Father Klaus Riesenhuber, a philosophy professor at Sophia University, and was given the name "Raphael."

Koseki works in theater, music, and animation productions. His scholastic interests span religion, theology, mythology, archetypology, digital content creation and film.

Koseki is known for his involvement in Andrew Lloyd Webber's musical the Phantom of the Opera. In 2007, his focus shifted to Japanese anime. He registered a trademark, "Aquilon" with the Japan Patent Office and his freelance activities are copyrighted by Aquilon.

== Career ==
Koseki began his career as a stagehand for Phantom of the Opera when it debuted in Japan under the Shiki Theatrical Company. In 1990, Koseki became the show's technical director. At the time, he decided to study graphic design at the Académie Julian/ESAG (Ecole Supérieure d'Art Graphique) in Paris, France. For the next few years, he backpacked through Europe, crossing Spain and the Sahara Desert, as well as visiting the United States.

From 1995 to 1998, Koseki continued his involvement in Phantom of the Opera as the show's opening advisor. In 1996, he established an independent record label and produced a CD featuring Satoko Yoshioka who played the "Christine" role in the Phantom of the Opera. His expertise in technologies such as DTM/DTP was used to compose and edit the music as well as design the CD art

== Scholastic activities ==
In 1988, Koseki began studying analytical psychology under Harumi Yamane, a Jungian analyst and diplomate candidate of C. G. Jung Institute. Using Dream Analysis and Active Imagination, Koseki studied how images and stories may be used to access the unconscious.

== Education ==
- BA in theology, Sophia University, Tokyo, 2004 – thesis: "The encounter of C.G. Jung’s symbolism and Christian faith."
- MA in Digital Content Management, Digital Hollywood University, Tokyo, 2007. – thesis: "The examination of contemporary fables from a theological perspective."
- MA in Community and Human Services, St. Paul Rikkyo University, Tokyo, 2008. – thesis: "The dreaming culture of the ancient Jewish world: Its origin and the biblical account of Jacob."

== Academic activities ==
- Fellow of the Centre of Industry-Academia-Government Collaboration, Digital Hollywood University, Tokyo
- Member of Contents Institute Japan
- Member of International Arthurian Society
- Lecturer of "King Arthur: Workshop" in Keio University, Tokyo
  - Reading and Creating Alfred Tennyson, "The Lady of Shalott", Organiser: FUWA Yuri ' 2010 Sept. 06–07, Keio University, Tokyo
  - Reading and Analysis Alfred Tennyson's "The Lady of Shalott", Organiser: FUWA Yuri ' 2010 Nov. 05, Keio University, Tokyo
- Researcher of "Keio University Arthurian Seminar; Critical Reading and Creative Writing" in Keio University, Tokyo
- Lecturer in Digital Holy wood school, Tokyo
  - Lecturer: Reading and Analysis Alfred Tennyson's "The Lady of Shalott" by Depth Psychology with GOMI, Sawako, Organiser: FUWA Yuri ' 2011 June. 17, Keio University, Tokyo

== Entertainment ==
- Music CD
  - Silence of the Moon Lapis Lazuli Record, Japan, 1996.
- Concert
  - "Gradually," (Classical Piano), Rina Yamaguchi, Aquilon, Tokyo, 2001.
  - "Vocal," Chikako Sasaki, Aquilon, Tokyo, 2001.
- Animation Film
  - Mobile Suit Gundam 00: Season 1” #12 #13, Studio: Sunrise, Network: TBS and MBS, On Air: 2008–2009. DVD: Bandai;
  - Eureka Seven: Good Night Sleep Tight Young Lovers, Credit Title: Myth Supervisor, Studio: Bones, Premiered in Japan, April 25, 2009. DVD: Bandai; ASIN: B002WHQ9Y0.
- Phonetic Drama
  - Quad Cross: Season 1 CD1, The Original Author. (C)2011 Aquilon. Developed by Production I.G, Released on December 29, 2011.
  - Quad Cross: Season 1 CD2, The Original Author. (C)2012 Aquilon. Developed by Production I.G, Released on May 30, 2012.
