= Sylvia Brinton Perera =

- Occupations: Author and Jungian Analysis

Academic background
- Education: Radcliffe

Academic work
- Discipline: Jungian psychology, psychology of religion

Sylvia Brinton Perera is an author and a Jungian analyst.

== Life and career ==
=== Professional ===
Qualified as a Jungian analyst, Perera is in private practice, counseling as a psychotherapist. Her earlier training included an MA in psychology; her undergraduate focus at Radcliffe was in art history. At the C. G. Jung Institute of New York, she became recognized as a training analyst and is a member of the faculty. She also served on its board of directors. In addition to her articles, Perera has authored four books on Jungian psychology, and is co-author of another. She also has located her practice in Vermont.

=== Personal ===
The eldest of five children of a Quaker family, Perera came of age in Scarsdale, New York. She has two children by her former husband, political scientist Gregory James Massell. Jungian analyst and author Edward Christopher Whitmont became her partner until his death in 1998.

== Commentary ==
=== In general ===
Andrew Samuels discusses Perera in terms of the developing feminist perspective on Jung's psychology. He proposes three such groups: first, those working with Eros and "psychic relatedness" (including Esther Harding and Toni Wolff); second, those who view a woman not as one who relates, but "as she is, in her own right" (Perera, Marion Woodman and Ann Belford Ulanov); and third, those most compatible with contemporary feminism (e.g., June Singer re androgyny). Samuels later adds that Perera wrote of finding a nascent therapy, a "wisdom in change" embedded in an ancient goddess myth. Such myths were often overlooked by the prevailing patriarchal view.

=== Descent to the Goddess ===
Perera's 1981 book Descent to the Goddess concerns the commanding Inanna of Sumer who presides over the avenues of "destiny". More terrifying is her underworld sister Ereshkigal with the "eye of death". Edward C. Whitmont compares Perera's description here of the yin of 'feminine consciousness' to that of Erich Neumann's. As portrayed by Perera, under the sway of Ereshkigal a woman may become familiar with impersonal energies that can inflict a pitiless pain on other people, yet be part of a healing process and a stage of psychological growth. Inanna's "descent into the underworld presages a renewal of life."

Susan Rowland also discusses Perera's 1981 book, which she calls "popular and influential". The shadow-sister Ereshkigal holds archetypes of great pain, but also of healing. "[T]his goddess myth of an underworld journey and return enables Perera to shape depressive mental states as potentially empowering women."

== Selected works ==
- Descent to the Goddess: A Way of Initiation for Women. Toronto: Inner City Books 1981. ISBN 978-0919123052
- The Scapegoat Complex: Toward a Mythology of Shadow and Guilt. Toronto: Inner City Books 1986. ISBN 978-0919123229
- Celtic Queen Maeve and Addiction. An Archetypal Perspective. New York: Ibris Press 2001; London: Nicolas Hayes 2001. ISBN 978-0892540570
- The Irish Bull God: Image of Multiform and Integral Masculinity. Toronto: Inner City Books 2004. ISBN 978-1894574082
  - Dreams, A Portal to the Source, co-author Edward Christopher Whitmont. London: Routledge 1992. ISBN 978-0415064538
