= Jungian interpretation of religion =

The Jungian interpretation of religion, pioneered by Carl Jung and advanced by his followers, is an attempt to interpret religion in the light of Jungian psychology. Unlike Sigmund Freud and his followers, Jungians tend to treat religious beliefs and behaviors in a positive light, while offering psychological referents to traditional religious terms such as "soul", "evil", "transcendence", "the sacred", and "God". Because beliefs do not have to be facts in order for people to hold them, the Jungian interpretation of religion has been, and continues to be, of interest to psychologists and theists.

== Jungian psychology ==
Jung established a school of psychology that emphasizes the human quest for wholeness (which he defined as the integration of conscious and unconscious components of the psyche) through a process called individuation. Through studying folklore, world mythologies, and the dreams of his patients, Jung identified these components of the psyche as expressions of instinctual patterns (or archetypes). The role of the psychoanalyst in the Jungian approach is to assist in the analysis of dreams and symbols and prevent the patient from being overwhelmed by unconscious material or being cut off from the meaning offered by suprapersonal forces. Jungian analysts typically believe that the psyche is the source of healing and the drive toward individuation.

== Western religious tradition ==
Jung's assessment of Western religion arose both from his own experiences as well as from the psychotherapeutic work with his European clients. As a young man, he had visions and dreams that were powerful and rich with meaning; yet he clung to Christianity. While he believed that God could "do stupendous things to me, things of fire and unearthly light", he was profoundly disappointed by his first communion—in his words, "nothing happened". He saw the same symptoms in his clients: namely, a fascination with the power of the unconscious, coupled with the inadequacy of Western religious symbols and rituals to represent this power. Summing up his analysis of the modern European situation, he wrote: "Our age wants to experience the psyche for itself ... knowledge, instead of faith."

According to Jungian training analyst Murray B. Stein, Jung related theological and psychological constructs using three tenets:

1. Theological elements (such as God) can be interpreted to refer to psychological concepts.
2. Psychologists can evaluate the adequacy of theological constructs against the dynamics of the psyche.
3. Words about the psyche are also words about God, due to the correspondence between subjectivity and objectivity.

== Eastern religious tradition ==
Jung wrote a number of books and articles about Eastern religions, including commentaries on the Tibetan Book of the Dead, yoga, and Eastern meditation. He contributed forewords to books on Zen Buddhism, Holy Men of India, and the I Ching. In his book The Archetypes of the Collective Unconscious he also deals with Islam, specifically by interpreting a few famous stories found in the Quran.

=== Yoga and the West ===
In the essay "Yoga and the West", from his book Psychology and the East Jung explores how yoga and Eastern spiritual practices began to influence Western thought during the Enlightenment era. While the Western divides between science and religion, Jung argues that knowledge and faith should complement each other rather than remain in opposition. He suggests that yoga, with its scientific aspects, offers a bridge between knowledge and faith, making it appealing to Westerners.

Jung acknowledges the effectiveness of yoga for mental and physical well-being and its potential to integrate the physical and spiritual dimensions. However, he believes that the Western psyche and the division between science and belief make it challenging to fully adopt yoga. He warns against practicing yoga without a deep understanding of the Eastern psyche, as it may lead to misunderstandings and misuse of yogic powers.

Jung predicts that the West will eventually develop its own form of yoga, emphasizing the importance of inner transformation and a modern psychological approach. He subtly suggests his own psychological approach as a complement to yoga. He believes that this approach can help individuals confront their unconscious and achieve wholeness.

=== Holy men ===
In the essay "The Holy Men of India", from his book Psychology and the East, Jung discusses his introduction to a book by Heinrich Zimmer about the Indian holy man Shri Ramana Maharshi. It provides context about Zimmer's interest in Indian spirituality and insights he shared with Jung. He furthermore expresses concern about the rapid externalization of culture and the potential loss of spiritual values in both East and West. He suggests that figures like Shri Ramana Maharshi and Ramakrishna serve as modern prophets, reminding their cultures of the importance of inner spiritual development amidst material progress.

Jung's essay also indirectly addresses the challenges of modernity, where materialism and external pursuits often overshadow inner growth. According to him, the West's materialistic mindset has led to a loss of connection with its true nature, resulting in depression and anxiety. He suggests that the wisdom of Eastern spirituality, exemplified by Shri Ramana, offers valuable insights for modern individuals seeking meaning and balance.

Jung furthermore discusses the concept of "Men=God", how this concept is expressed in the teachings of Shri Ramana Maharshi and how it differs from Western thought. Jung also highlights that both Eastern and Western traditions share common ground in terms of the goal of religious practice, albeit with different terminologies: a shift from ego-consciousness to self-consciousness, from man to God.

=== Psychology of Eastern meditation ===
In the essay "The Psychology of Eastern Meditation", from Jung`s book Psychology and the East, Jung explores the fundamental differences between Eastern and Western approaches to reality and spirituality. He therefore analyses the Amita-yur-dhyana sutra from theistic Buddhism, highlighting the use of symbols and visualization techniques and how they help to access deeper layers of the unconscious mind.

He goes on to describe the Indian reality as one that allows individuals to enter a dream-like state where they feel closer to the divine. Furthermore, he contrasts this with the Western mindset, which seeks to understand reality through the mind and external observations. This focus on the external world shapes the unconscious mind in a way that makes it difficult for the West to achieve the same level of inner connection as yogis from the East. Jung therefore stresses that Westerners should first understand their own unconsciousness before attempting practices like yoga.

Additionally, Jung introduces the idea that the ego and higher self need to coexist in balance, contrary to some Eastern philosophies that emphasize the transcendence of the ego. He argues that both are necessary for self-awareness and consciousness.

== Gnosticism ==
Carl Jung and his associate G. R. S. Mead worked on trying to understand and explain the gnostic faith from a psychological standpoint. Jung's analytical psychology in many ways schematically mirrors ancient gnostic mythology, particularly those of Valentinus and the 'classic' gnostic doctrine described in most detail in the Apocryphon of John (see gnostic schools).

Jung understands the emergence of the Demiurge out of the original, unified monadic source of the spiritual universe by gradual stages to be analogous to (and a symbolic depiction of) the emergence of the ego from the unconscious. However, it is uncertain as to whether the similarities between Jung's psychological teachings and those of the Gnostics are due to their sharing a "perennial philosophy", or whether Jung was unwittingly influenced by the Gnostics in the formation of his theories. Jung's own 'gnostic hymn', the Septem Sermones ad Mortuos (The Seven Sermons to the Dead), would tend to imply the latter, but after circulating the manuscript, Jung declined to publish it during his lifetime. Since it is not clear whether Jung was ultimately displeased with the book or whether he merely suppressed it as too controversial, the issue remains contested. Uncertain too are Jung's belief that the gnostics were aware of and intended psychological meaning or significance within their myths.

On the other hand, it is clear from a comparison of Jung's writings and that of ancient Gnostics, that Jung disagreed with them on the ultimate goal of the individual. Gnostics in ancient times clearly sought a return to a supreme, other-worldly Godhead. In a study of Jung, Robert Segal wrote that he believed that the psychologist would have found the psychological interpretation of the goal of ancient Gnosticism (that is, re-unification with the Pleroma, or the unknown God) to be psychically 'dangerous', as being a total identification with the unconscious. To contend that there is at least some disagreement between Jung and Gnosticism is at least supportable: the Jungian process of individuation involves the addition of unconscious psychic tropes to consciousness in order to achieve a trans-conscious centre to the personality. Jung did not intend this addition to take the form of a complete identification of the Self with the Unconscious.

== Extensions and criticisms ==
Edward F. Edinger systematized and extended Jung's interpretation of the Abrahamic God, particularly in his book Ego and Archetype. Professor Wallace Clift, an Episcopal priest, explored similarities between Jung's vision of humanity as "a story of developing consciousness" with Christianity's doctrine of "the Holy Spirit understood as present in each person. ... It is not a matter of making out each person a 'God', but on the contrary, realizing that within each person lies the potentiality of responding to God by bringing that encounter into consciousness." He further proposed the existence of a new post-Jungian archetype of pilgrimage.

Episcopal priest and Jungian analyst John A. Sanford, interprets Jesus' teachings from a Jungian perspective in his 1970 book The Kingdom Within in which he associates being a Pharisee with identifying with our mask or persona. He interprets the Devil or temptation to sin as "the inner adversary", the saying "love your enemies" as the dictate to discover and remove our projections from others, and advocates Jesus as the exemplar of human wholeness, uniting body, soul, spirit, sexuality, eros, and meaning through love. Jungian analyst and professor of psychology and religion Robert L. Moore cites Christ as expressing four archetypes found in the male psyche: the Warrior (in wrestling with his inner demons in the desert and at Gethsemane); the Lover (in radicalizing the commandment to love our neighbors); the Magician (in changing water to wine, feeding the thousands, and healing the sick); and the King (in generating the Kingdom of God, and in identifying himself with the way to the Father).

James Hillman, founder of archetypal psychology, has done much to expose the unacknowledged or shadow "Christianisms" within Jungian depth psychology itself, e.g. one barrier to grasping the underworld or domain of Hades as the psychic realm is Christ's victory over death. Similarly, the model for viewing the shadow as a moral problem is the Christian doctrine of sin. Hillman believes that soul or interiority refers not only to humans but to inanimate objects and to the world. Hillman is critical of Jung's convention of equating symbols of roundness (e.g. the rose window of a cathedral) with the Self, and discourages the attempt to achieve undivided wholeness by integrating parts. Jung's Self (representing the inner God) derives from monotheism, and by contrast Hillman encourages a polytheistic perspective.

Fr. Victor White, an English Dominican theologian and priest, and Jung carried on a 15 year correspondence. Through their dialog, White attempted to integrate analytical psychology into Catholic theology while Jung attempted to re-interpret Christian symbols. It was clear to White that "Jung was a psychiatrist and not a professional philosopher and/or theologian – and that there were important theological issues which Jung seemed, for whatever reason, not to understand or to value". One unresolved point was White's perspective that evil is the absence of good, whereas Jung believed that an adequate god image must include evil to balance the good. In addition, White floundered on Jung's assumption that the god image in Abrahamic religions changes over time, and that it would be replaced by something different in the distant future. In his 1994 book, Richard Noll makes the case that Jung promoted his psychological theories as a pagan religion, and asserts that one cannot be both a Catholic and a Jungian.

Jewish theologian and philosopher Martin Buber had a lifelong interest in psychoanalysis, and may have attended the same Eranos conference with Jung in 1934. In 1952 Buber and Jung exchanged letters regarding a paper Buber had published entitled "Religion and Modern Thinking". In his rejoinder, Buber wrote that he believed that Jung had strayed outside his realm of expertise into theology by asserting that God does not exist independent of the psyches of human beings. He concluded that Jung was "mystically deifying the instincts instead of hallowing them in faith", which he called a "modern manifestation of Gnosis".

Naomi R. Goldenberg, after reviewing Jung's idea of archetypes as disembodied Platonic forms and on the damage done to women by the mind-body dichotomy, suggests that "feminist theory radically depart from the Jungian archetype [and] from all systems of thought that posit transcendent, superhuman deities." While rejecting this part of Jungian theory, she recommends that women can use Jung's practice of active imagination, or "dreaming the dream onward", to form a satisfying psychospiritual community. Marie-Louise von Franz' book analyzing the dreams of the dying concludes that "the unconscious ... prepares [us] not for a definite end but for a profound transformation and for a kind of continuation of the life process". She joins with Edinger in suggesting that some dreams cannot be adequately interpreted as symbolic representations of subjective inner processes, but are metaphysical, hinting at a reality that is deeply mysterious.

== See also ==
- Archetypal psychology
- Higher consciousness
