= Irene Claremont de Castillejo =

- Born: 1885; London
- Died: 1967 (aged 81–82); London, England
- Citizenship: British, Spanish
- Education: Cambridge University, C. G. Jung Institute, Zürich
- Known for: author of Knowing Woman
- Scientific career
- Fields: Jungian analysis

Irene Claremont de Castillejo (born in London, 1885 – died in London 1967) was a writer and Jungian analyst. She is remembered especially for her posthumously published classic text, Knowing Woman: A Feminine Psychology, (1973).

== Biography ==
Irene Claremont de Castillejo was a graduate of Cambridge University in History and Economics. In 1922 she married the jurist and professor of education, José Castillejo. They went to live in Spain in her husband's home in Madrid, 'Olivar de Castillejo', at Chamartín, presently known as the 'Olivar de Castillejo Foundation'. They had four children, Jacinta, Leonardo, David and Sorrel.

In 1936 with the out-break of the Spanish Civil War the family moved to England, followed by a stay in Switzerland, and again back to England in 1939 on account of the German invasion of Europe.

Following the death of her husband in London in 1945, Irene began her studies in Jungian psychology in Zurich working with Carl Gustav Jung, Emma Jung and Toni Wolff. On her return to London, she established a psychotherapy practice specialising in the role of women in the world of today.

Irene died in London in 1967.

== Works ==
- Knowing Woman. A Feminine Psychology
- Freedom of the city
- I Married a Stranger

== "Knowing Woman" ==
Her classic text, originally published in 1973, has been re-issued in several editions since. It is a distillation of her wisdom garnered through life experience and her work as a therapist. She expresses herself thus:

Psychologists have inadvertently side-slipped into this dreary passion for normality. But I am not so sure that to be balanced is necessarily a virtue. Some urgent inner problem or some imbalance may actually provide the impetus for dealing with outer wrongs. The rebel who is stirred to action by injustice or cruelty to others may well have himself suffered from an inner tyrant which bullies him.

Most geniuses in whatever field are, to ordinary eyes, more than a little mad. The heavy price some artists have to pay for their unusual insight may be lack of balance. The world would have been a poorer place without Van Gogh.

The trouble is that psychologists believe they can see and explain patterns of behaviour. On certain levels maybe they can, but let us never forget the unique unknowableness of every individual soul.

== See also ==
- Rafael López-Pedraza

== Bibliography ==
- Claremont de Castillejo, Irene (1997). Knowing Woman. A Feminine Psychology. Shambhala Publications. ISBN 978-1-57062-204-5.
- Claremont de Castillejo, Irene (1995). Respaldada por el viento (in Spanish). Editorial Castalia. ISBN 978-84-7039-716-5.
