= Adolf Guggenbühl-Craig =

Swiss analytical psychologist

Adolf Guggenbühl-Craig (1923 – 18 July 2008) was a Swiss psychiatrist and analytical psychologist, member of the archetypal school of Jungian analysis. He was the author of many publications.

== Life ==
Guggenbühl-Craig was born in 1923 in Zürich, Switzerland. He was the son of the well-respected Zürich publisher, Adolf Guggenbühl. He studied theology at University of Zurich with the idea of becoming a pastor, then worked at his father's publishing firm. He went on to work as an auxiliary social worker while on the side studying philosophy and history at the University of Basel. He finally decided to study medicine at Zürich and directly after taking his final exam, left for America where he took on various house jobs. After a spell of four years in the United States, where he had entered a Freudian analysis on Rhode Island, he returned to his homeland and specialised in Psychiatry. He began a Jungian analysis with Franz Niklaus Riklin, son of Franz Beda Riklin, which did not preclude his adherence to Christianity, and studied at the C. G. Jung Institute, Zürich, but left without a diploma. He subsequently opened a private Psychotherapy practice in Zürich. During that period he met the American Jungian follower, James Hillman, who was highly critical of Guggenbühl's status as a practitioner without a diploma, but he overcame the prejudice and the two men became friends. He was married to Scottish sculptor and singer, Anne Craig (1929-2018). He added her surname to his, at her request, to distinguish himself from his father. They had five children one of whom, their son, Allan Guggenbühl, became a psychotherapist.

He was personally acquainted with Jung, and greatly influenced by his work, although he did not care either for the man, his adulation nor for his acolytes. He was a lecturer and director of the C. G. Jung Institute, Zürich for ten years. Later he served as president of the IAAP. From his practice in Switzerland he made numerous contributions to analytical psychology. He influenced a great many Jungians all round the world, based on his work as a psychotherapist, analyst and teacher. He was the author of numerous articles and sought after books.

He died at the age of 85.

His papers are lodged with the OPUS Archives and Research Center, Pacifica Graduate Institute in Carpinteria, California.

== Works ==
- Marriage: dead or alive
- Power in the helping professions
- The emptied soul. On the nature of the psychopath
- Marriage is dead – Long live marriage!
- The old fool and the corruption of myth, featured in a documentary film by Stephen Segaller.
- From the wrong side. A paradoxical approach to psychology

== See also ==
- James Hillman

== Bibliography ==
In English

- Power in the Helping Professions. Spring Publications. 2009. ISBN 978-0-88214-304-0.
- The Emptied Soul. On the Nature of the Psychopath. Spring Publications. October 1999. ISBN 978-0-88214-371-2.
- Marriage is Dead – Long Live Marriage!. Spring Publications. 17 March 2009. ISBN 978-0-88214-594-5.
- The Old Fool and the Corruption of Myth. Spring Publications. 1991. ISBN 978-0-88214-351-4.
- From the Wrong Side. A Paradoxical Approach to Psychology. Spring Publications. 1995. ISBN 978-0-88214-357-6.
