= Alphonse Maeder =

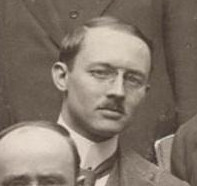
- Maeder in 1911
- Born: 11 September 1882; La Chaux-de-Fonds, Switzerland
- Died: 27 January 1971 (aged 88); Zurich, Switzerland
- Occupation: Psychiatrist
- Notable work: Psychoanalysis - Analytical psychology
- Title: Doctor

Alphonse Maeder (11 September 1882 – 27 January 1971), alternatively spelled Alphons Maeder or Alphonse Mäder was a Swiss physician who specialised in psychiatry, psychotherapy, and psychoanalysis. He worked as an assistant to Eugen Bleuler and Carl Jung and worked with Sigmund Freud and contributed to the study of dreams and their functions, the relationship between the patient and the analyst, and the healing process.
