= Andrew Samuels =

British psychologist (born 1949)

Andrew Samuels (born 19 January 1949) is a British psychotherapist and writer on political and social themes from a psychological viewpoint. He has worked with politicians, political organisations, activist groups and members of the public in Europe, US, Brazil, Israel, Japan, Russia and South Africa as a political and organisational consultant. Clinically, Samuels has developed a blend of Jungian and post-Jungian, relational psychoanalytic and humanistic approaches.

== Career ==
Andrew Samuels began his career running a commune-style radical theatre company in the late 1960s and early 1970s, directing plays in and around Oxford. At the age of 22 he declined an offer to become the assistant director at the Royal Shakespeare Company and instead went on to develop a drama and youth counselling project in South Wales, working with deprived children. He then gained a Diploma in Social Administration at the London School of Economics, subsequently qualified as a psychiatric social worker and went on to train at the Society of Analytical Psychology (founded in 1946 in London to develop the ideas of Carl Jung) where he is a training analyst.

He co-founded Psychotherapists and Counsellors for Social Responsibility which was formed in 1995 as an independent organisation that emerged from the United Kingdom Council for Psychotherapy.It was founded by a group of therapists and analysts from disparate theoretical backgrounds (psychoanalytical, Jungian and Humanistic) who wished to use the insights gained in the consulting room and elsewhere by taking them into the outside world to influence political and public discourse. Considering the sometimes enormous interdisciplinary divides, it sought to bridge these divisions. The organisation deliberately included psychoanalysts, psychotherapists and counsellors under one roof, something never previously attempted.

He co-founded "Antidote": a psychotherapy-based think tank which, supported by a number of New Labour luminaries, launched its manifesto for an "Emotionally Literate Society" at the Houses of Parliament. He is also a founding member of the International Association for Jungian Studies, a learned society formed in 2002 for Jungian scholars and clinicians.

Samuels and Renos Papadopoulos were among the first professors of Analytical psychology in the world (the first being David H. Rosen at Texas A&M University in 1986). They are the co-founders of the Masters in Jungian and Post-Jungian Studies at the Centre for Psychoanalytic Studies at the University of Essex, UK. The ethos of the course is to take an informative, critical and reflective stance in relation to the core concepts of Analytical psychology as developed by Carl Jung, post-Jungians of all schools and scholars in academic disciplines. This is balanced with an emphasis on clinical theory as well as on applications of Analytical psychology in areas such as cultural and gender studies, social and political theory, philosophy and religion.

In 2006, he was elected one of the first group of six honorary fellows of the United Kingdom Council for Psychotherapy (UKCP). In 2009, he was elected chair of the UKCP. He is Emeritus Professor of Analytical Psychology at Essex, Visiting Professor of Psychoanalytic Studies at Goldsmiths, University of London, Honorary Professor of Psychology and Therapeutic Studies at Roehampton University and Visiting Adjunct Professor at the New York University Postdoctoral Program in Psychotherapy and Psychoanalysis.

== Books ==
Samuels' books include Jung and the Post-Jungians (1985), The Father (1986), A Critical Dictionary of Jungian Analysis (1986, with Bani Shorter and Alfred Plaut), The Plural Psyche (1989), Psychopathology: Contemporary Jungian Perspectives (1992), The Political Psyche (1993) and Politics on the Couch: Citizenship and the Internal Life (2001). This last book won the Gradiiva Prize 2001 awarded by the National Association for the Advancement of Psychoanalysis. Andrew Samuels' books have been translated into 19 languages.

== Select bibliography ==
=== Books ===
- Samuels, A., (1985). Jung and the PostJungians. London: Routledge and Kegan Paul. ISBN 0-7100-9958-4
- Samuels, A., (ed.)(1985). The Father: Contemporary Jungian Perspectives. London: Free Association Books. ISBN 978-0-946960-28-6
- Samuels, A., Shorter, Bani. and Plaut, Fred. (1986). A Critical Dictionary of Jungian Analysis. London: Routledge and Kegan Paul. ISBN 978-0-415-05910-7
- Samuels, A., (1989). The Plural Psyche: Personality, Morality & The Father. London: Routledge. ISBN 0-415-01760-2
- Samuels, A., (ed.) (1992). Psychopathology: Contemporary Jungian Perspectives. New York: Guildford Press. ISBN 978-0-89862-473-1
- Samuels, A., (1993). The Political Psyche. London: Routledge. ISBN 0-415-08102-5
- Samuels, A., (2001). Politics on the Couch : Citizenship and the Internal Life. London : Profile. ISBN 1-86197-219-9

=== Book chapters ===
- Samuels, A., (1996). 'The Future of Jungian Studies: A Personal Agenda.' In M. Stanton & D. Reason (eds) Teaching Transference: On the Foundation of Psychoanalytic Studies, London: Rebus Press. ISBN 978-1-900877-01-5
- Samuels, A., (1998). 'Will the post-Jungians Survive?' In Casement, A. (ed.) Post-Jungians Today, Key papers in Contemporary Analytical Psychology New York: Routledge. ISBN 0-415-16155-X.
- Samuels, A. (2006). 'Transference/Countertransference.' In R. Papadopoulos (ed.) Handbook of Jungian Psychology. New York: Routledge. ISBN 1-58391-148-0

=== Journal articles ===
- Samuels, Andrew (1980). "Incest and Omnipotence in the Internal Family". Journal of Analytical Psychology. 25 (1): 37–57. doi:10.1111/j.1465-5922.1980.00037.x. PMID 7298502.
- Samuels, A. (1982). "The Image of the Parents in Bed". Journal of Analytical Psychology. 27 (4): 323–339. doi:10.1111/j.1465-5922.1982.00323.x.
- Samuels, A. (1983). "The Emergence of Schools of Post-Jungian Analytical Psychology". Journal of Analytical Psychology. 28 (4): 345–362. doi:10.1111/j.1465-5922.1983.00345.x. PMID 6643272.
- Samuels, A. (1983). "The Theory of Archetypes in Jungian and Post-Jungian Analytical Psychology". International Review of Psycho-Analysis. 10: 429–444.
- Samuels, A. (1985). "Symbolic Dimensions of Eros in Transference-Counter Transference: Some Clinical Uses of Jung's Alchemical Metaphor". International Review of Psycho-Analysis. 12: 199–214.
- Samuels, A. (1985). "Countertransference, the 'Mundus Imaginalis' and A Research Project". Journal of Analytical Psychology. 30 (1): 47–71. doi:10.1111/j.1465-5922.1985.00047.x. PMID 3988621.
- Samuels, A. (1988). "One Psychoanalysis or Many?". International Journal of Psycho-Analysis. 69: 551–552. PMID 3220678.
- Samuels, A. (1989). "Analysis and Pluralism: The Politics of Psyche". Journal of Analytical Psychology. 34 (1): 33–51. doi:10.1111/j.1465-5922.1989.00033.x.
- Samuels, A. (1989). "Plaut in Conversation with Andrew Samuels". Journal of Analytical Psychology. 34 (2): 159–183. doi:10.1111/j.1465-5922.1989.00159.x.
- Samuels, A., (1991). 'Pluralism and Training', Journal of the British Association of Psychotherapists, 22.
- Sanuels, Andrew (1991). "Parents as Messengers". British Journal of Psychotherapy. 7 (4): 341–355. doi:10.1111/j.1752-0118.1991.tb01140.x.
- Samuels, A. (1992). "The Plural Psyche". International Review of Psycho-Analysis. 19: 229–230.
- Samuels, A. (1992). "National Psychology, National Socialism, and Analytical Psychology Reflections on Jung and anti-semitism Part I". Journal of Analytical Psychology. 37 (1): 3–28. doi:10.1111/j.1465-5922.1992.00003.x.
- Samuels, A. (1992). "National Psychology, National Socialism, and Analytical Psychology:. Reflections on Jung and anti-semitism Part II". Journal of Analytical Psychology. 37 (2): 127–148. doi:10.1111/j.1465-5922.1992.00127.x.
- Samuels, Andrew (1993). "What is a Good Training?". British Journal of Psychotherapy. 9 (3): 317–323. doi:10.1111/j.1752-0118.1993.tb01231.x.
- Samuels, A. (1993). "New Material Concerning Jung, Anti-Semitism, and the Nazis". Journal of Analytical Psychology. 38 (4): 463–470. doi:10.1111/j.1465-5922.1993.00463.x.
- Samue, Andrew (1996). "From Sexual Misconduct to Social Justice". Psychoanalytic Dialogues. 6 (3): 295–321. doi:10.1080/10481889609539122.
- Samuels, A. (2000). "Post-Jungian Dialogues". Psychoanalytic Dialogues. 10 (3): 403–426. doi:10.1080/10481881009348555. S2CID 219729333.
- Samuels, A. (2004). "Politics on the Couch?: Psychotherapy and Society—Some Possibilities and Some Limitations". Psychoanalytic Dialogues. 14 (6): 817–834. doi:10.1080/10481881409348809. S2CID 219727791.

=== Newspaper articles ===
- Samuels, Andrew (14 September 2004). "Comment & Analysis: Solutions for our lost children". The Guardian. London: Guardian Media Group. p. 25.
- Samuels, Andrew (25 January 2012). "This could be Carl Jung's century". The Guardian. Guardian Media Group.
