= International Association for Jungian Studies =

Academic organization

Formed in 2002, the International Association for Jungian Studies (IAJS) is a learned society for Jungian scholars and clinicians.

== Background ==
The IAJS differs in its focus from the international Jungian organisation, the International Association for Analytical Psychology (IAAP), in that the IAAP is a professional regulatory body for member societies and developing groups of clinicians, and those in training, whereas the IAJS concentrates on professional or scholarly interest in Jungian and post-Jungian theory. Both are open to clinicians, scholars, scientists, clergy, artists, and others.

The IAJS organises semi-annual to annual conferences, at which academic papers are presented.

The IAJS formerly had a stake in the Jungian journal Harvest, until it was announced in February 2007 that IAJS had amicably parted with Harvest and would be publishing the International Journal for Jungian Studies. As of July 2006, the IAJS had 408 members from various countries around the world.

== See also ==
- Carl Jung
- Depth Psychology
