= Frame (psychotherapy) =

Term in psychotherapy and psychoanalysis

The frame or therapeutic frame or analytic frame in psychotherapy and psychoanalysis are the various environmental factors which make therapy possible, yet are not internal to therapy or to the therapeutic process itself. According to psychoanalytic theory, there are many such factors, such as setting and agreeing to the fee for treatment, agreeing on a definite schedule when to meet, principles associated with anonymity and privacy on the part of the therapist, and other factors. While these factors are not inherently internal to the therapeutic process they (1) set conditions that make sound therapy possible and (2) because of their importance for therapy, often become areas of conflict and exploration within therapy. Consequently, setting a secured frame may be a necessary condition for sound psychoanalytic psychotherapy because it enables therapy patients to be open about their life with the therapist and to feel emotionally secure enough to speak about their deepest emotional conflicts. In some currents of psychoanalysis, the frame is one of the most important elements in psychotherapy and counseling.

While the psychoanalyst Robert Langs did not coin the term, he did make it famous. The "frame" is an image meant to express the set of agreed upon boundaries or ground rules of therapy.

== Significance ==
Robert Langs writes, "The therapist's management of the ground rules of psychotherapy constitute his or her most fundamental arena of intervention, and the therapists efforts in this regard will greatly influence all of the other dimensions of the therapeutic interaction and experience". Langs maintains this idea on the grounds that, in general, the emotional disturbances which bring patients to therapy arise from difficulties associated with adaptation. Consequently, an undeveloped, underdeveloped or unarticulated therapeutic frame will tend to produce unconscious anxiety in patients, because it is either unknown or unclear to the patient what the conditions are to which they must adapt in therapy. Further, Langs suggests that the failure to have a clearly developed and articulated therapeutic frame is often the product of unconscious anxiety on the part of the therapist.

Langs also argues that it is only within a secured therapeutic frame that a patient will feel emotionally safe enough to communicate their most painful emotional struggles. Langs even goes so far as to claim that the patient's capacity to symbolize, i.e., be sufficiently contained emotionally so as neither to repress affect nor act affect out (either within or outside of therapy) in part depends on the therapeutic frame being sufficiently secure. Langs argues that there are three distinct "communicative fields" potentially present within the therapeutic environment and that it is only within "secured frame therapy" that the ideal communicative field, the symbolizing field ("Type A field"), necessary for authentic psychoanalytic work, can actually occur. Thus, success in psychoanalytic psychotherapy is associated with the therapeutic relationship between the client and the therapist, which in turns depends on the therapeutic environment that the therapist establishes, reflecting the genuineness of the therapeutic relationship between the two.

Langs' later work took the concept of the frame somewhat further, in that Langs came to believe that the fundamental basis of deep emotional disturbances is trauma and, especially, death-related trauma and death anxieties. Or, put in Langs' earlier terminology, death and death anxiety are the deepest and most difficult "adaptive context." But, if so, Langs suggests, this causes a therapeutic paradox for psychoanalytic psychotherapy: on the one hand, secured-frame therapy is necessary for sound psychoanalytic therapy and yet secured-frame therapy is also provokes death anxiety in patients, because firm boundaries of any kind tend to provoke anxieties around the firmest and most final of boundaries, death. Thus, the secured frame is necessary for sound, depth-oriented therapy and yet it also evokes the very anxiety that it is meant to cure.

== Further developments ==
The Swedish psychoanalyst Claes Davidson, who thoroughly studied Langs, has taken the frames of psychoanalysis and psychotherapy even further and concludes that most of today's clients' primary problems are not found in the deep unconscious domain, but in the conscious and/or the preconscious ones. These (pre-)conscious conflicts, as Davidson names them, will manifest themselves in the clients' frame deviations, where they for resolution have to be addressed by the active therapist.

== Bibliography ==
- Cassimatis, E. G. (2001). On the frame of reference in psychotherapy and psychoanalysis. Journal of the American Academy of Psychoanalysis, 29:533-541
- Goodheart, W. B. (1980). Theory of Analytic Interaction. San Francisco Jung Institute Library Journal 1(4): 2–39.
- Langs, R. (1978). Technique in Transition. New York: Jason Aronson.
- Langs, R. (1978a). The Listening Process. New York: Jason Aronson.
- Langs, R. (1982). Psychotherapy: A Basic Text. New York: Jason Aronson.
- Langs, R. (1988). A Primer of Psychotherapy. Lake Worth, FL: Gardner Press. ISBN 0898761425
- Langs, R. (1998). Ground Rules in Psychotherapy and Counseling. London: Karnac Books.
- Langs, R. (2004). Fundamentals of Adaptive Psychotherapy and Counseling. London: Palgrave-Macmillan.
- Langs, R. (2004a). Death anxiety and the emotion processing mind, Psychoanalytic Psychology, vol. 21, no. 1, 31–53
- White, J. R. (2023) Adaptation and Psychotherapy. Langs and Analytical Psychology. Lanham: Rowman & Littlefield. ISBN 978-0-7448-0056-2
