= Beverley Zabriskie =

Jungian analyst and lecturer

Beverley Zabriskie is an American author, Jungian analyst and lecturer. She is a founding faculty member and former president of the Jungian Psychoanalytic Association (JPA) in New York City, associate editor of the Journal of Analytical Psychology and board member of The Philemon Foundation.

As the Fay Lecturer at Texas A&M University in 2007, Zabriskie presented the lecture series Emotion and Transformation: From Myth to Neuroscience. She was named the Psychoanalytic Educator of the Year for the International Federation of Psychoanalytic Education in 2002.

== Selected publications ==
- A Meeting of Rare Minds, the Preface to Atom and Archetype: The Pauli-Jung Correspondence, (Princeton University Press, 2001)
- Synchronicity and the I Ching: Jung, Pauli, and the Chinese Woman (Journal of Analytical Psychology, London, 2005)
- Time and Tao in Synchronicity in The Pauli-Jung Conjecture and Its Impact Today (Imprint Academic, Exeter, 2014)
- Psychic Energy and Synchronicity (Journal of Analytical Psychology, London, 2014)
- Energy and Emotion: C. G. Jung’s Fordham Declaration (Spring Journal Books, 2015) in Jung in the Academy and Beyond: The Fordham Lectures 100 Years later
