= June Singer =

American psychologist (1920–2004)

June Singer (1920 – January 19, 2004) was an American analytical psychologist. She co-founded the Analytical Psychology Club of Chicago, later the Jung Institute of Chicago, as well as the Inter-Regional Society of Jungian Analysts. She helped to popularize Carl Jung's theories in the United States, and wrote several well-regarded books.

== Biography ==
Singer accompanied her husband, Richard Singer, to the Jung Institute in Zurich, Switzerland, where she became interested in Jung and completed her own training as an analyst. The Singers returned to the United States to found the Analytical Psychology Club of Chicago in 1965. This organization later expanded, became known as the C. G. Jung Institute of Chicago, and joined the International Association for Analytical Psychology; June Singer remained a lifetime honorary member.

After Richard Singer died in 1964, June Singer was the only Jungian analyst in Chicago. She earned a PhD from Northwestern University in 1968.

In 1973–1974 Singer and several other Jungians in the U.S. founded the Inter-Regional Society of Jungian Analysts, which joined the International Association for Analytical Psychology.

Singer moved to Palo Alto in 1980, working at the Institute of Transpersonal Psychology and joining the San Francisco Jung Institute and the local Gnostic church.

In 1987, Singer married Dr. Irving Sunshine, with whom she returned to California and later retired in Ohio.

== Influence ==
June Singer worked as both a Jungian analyst and as an author and lecturer. Her 1972 book Boundaries of the Soul is considered to be one of the best introductions to Jungian thought, and played a significant role in popularizing Jungian psychology in the United States. Singer also wrote two books about sexuality, and a Jungian study of the poet William Blake.

== Bibliography ==
- The Unholy Bible: A Psychological Interpretation of William Blake (1970)
- Boundaries of the Soul:The Practice of Jung's Psychology (1972)
- Androgyny: Toward a New Theory of Sexuality (1976); retitled in 2000 as, Androgyny: The Opposites Within (Jung on the Hudson Book Series)
- Energies of Love: Sexuality re-visioned (1983)
- The Unholy Bible: Blake, Jung, and the Collective Unconscious (1986) (expanded edition of 1970 book)
- Seeing through the Visible World: Jung, Gnosis, and Chaos (1990); retitled in 1998 as, Modern Woman in Search of Soul: A Jungian Guide to the Visible and Invisible Worlds
- The Allure of Gnosticism: Gnostic Experience in Jungian Psychology and Contemporary Culture, Co-editor (1995)
- The Knowledge of the Heart (1999)
- The Power of Love (to transform our Lives and our World), Nicholas Hays Inc. under the Hudson Jung Book Series (2000)
- The Gnostic Book of Hours (2003)
