= Carl Alfred Meier =

Swiss psychiatrist and psychologist

Carl Alfred Meier (19 April 1905 – 1995) was a Swiss psychiatrist, Jungian psychologist, scholar, and first president of the C. G. Jung Institute in Zürich. As a successor to Carl Jung, he held the Chair of Honorary Professor of Psychology at the Swiss Federal Institute of Technology in 1949. Later, co-founded the Clinic and Research Center for Jungian Psychology in Zürichberg.

Meier was born in Schaffhausen, Switzerland, in 1905. He enrolled at the University of Zürich in 1924. In the winter semester of 1927, Meier traveled to Paris to study at the Medical Faculty of the University of Paris. Later, in 1928, he traveled to Vienna to study at the Steinhof (the Psychiatric Clinic of the University of Vienna), and to attend the lectures of Julius Wagner-Jauregg.

A colleague at Steinhof invited him to attend a series of Wednesday seminars delivered by Sigmund Freud. In 1931, he began his study of psychiatry under Hans-Wolfgang Maier at Burghölzli.

== Books ==
- A Testament to the Wilderness, C.A. Meier, ISBN 3-85630-502-5
- Consciousness (Psychology of C.G. Jung, Vol 3), C.A. Meier, ISBN 0-938434-12-8
- Healing Dream and Ritual: Ancient Incubation and Modern Psychotherapy, C. A. Meier, ISBN 3-85630-629-3
- Jung and analytical psychology, C.A. Meier, ASIN B0007DOKTM
- Jung and Analytical Psychology, C.A. Meier, ISBN 1-4254-8361-5
- Personality and Typology (Psychology of C.G. Jung, Vol 4), C.A. Meier, ISBN 0-938434-71-3
- Personality: The Individuation Process in Light of C.G. Jung's Typology, C.A. Meier, David N. Roscoe (Translator), ISBN 3-85630-549-1
- Soul and Body: Essays on the Theories of C.G. Jung, C.A. Meier, ISBN 0-932499-00-7
- The Meaning and Significance of Dreams (Psychology of C.G.Jung, Vol 2), C.A. Meier, ISBN 0-938434-11-X
- The Unconscious in Its Empirical Manifestations, C.A. Meier, Eugene Rolfe (Translator), ISBN 0-938434-68-3
- The Unconscious in Its Empirical Manifestations (Psychology of C.G. Jung, Vol 1), C.A. Meier, ISBN 0-938434-10-1
- Traum und Symbol, C.A. Meier, ASIN B0007DSWQE
