= Emma Jung =

Psychoanalyst and writer (1882–1955)

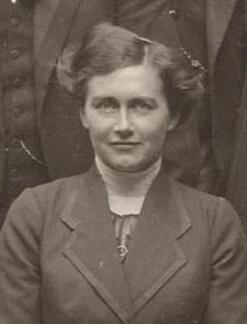
- Jung in c. 1911
- Born: Emma Marie Rauschenbach; 30 March 1882; Schaffhausen, Switzerland
- Died: 27 November 1955 (aged 73); Zürich, Switzerland
- Occupation: Psychoanalyst
- Spouse: Carl Jung (m. 1903)
- Children: 5

Emma Jung (born Emma Marie Rauschenbach, 30 March 1882 – 27 November 1955) was a Swiss Jungian analyst and author. She married Carl Jung, financing and helping him to become the prominent psychiatrist and founder of analytical psychology, and together they had five children. She was his "intellectual editor" to the end of her life. After her death, Jung is said to have described her as "a Queen".

== Biography ==
=== Early life ===
Emma Rauschenbach was the daughter of a wealthy industrialist, Johannes Rauschenbach, the then owner of IWC Schaffhausen. At the time of her marriage she was the second-richest heiress in Switzerland.

=== Family life ===
Emma Rauschenbach first met C. G. Jung in 1896 when she was still a schoolgirl, through a connection of his mother. Jung reported at the time that he knew then that one day Emma would be his wife. The couple married on 14 February 1903, seven years later. They had five children (four daughters and one son):

- Agathe Niehus, born on 28 December 1904
- Gret Baumann, born on 8 February 1906
- Franz Jung-Merker, born on 28 November 1908
- Marianne Niehus, born on 20 September 1910
- Helene Hoerni, born on 18 March 1914

Upon her father's death in 1905, Emma and her sister, together with their husbands, became owners of IWC Schaffhausen – the International Watch Company, manufacturers of luxury time-pieces. Emma's brother-in-law became the principal proprietor, but the Jungs remained shareholders in a thriving business that ensured the family's financial security for decades.

Emma Jung not only took a strong interest in her husband's work, but assisted him and became a noted analyst in her own right. She developed a particular focus on the Grail. She had a brief correspondence of her own with Sigmund Freud, during 1910–11. In 1906, Freud interpreted several of Jung's dreams of the period as portending the "failure of a marriage for money" (das Scheitern einer Geldheirat).

=== Death ===
Emma died in 1955, predeceasing Carl Jung by almost six years. After her death from a recurrence of cancer, he carved a stone in her name, "She was the foundation of my house". He is also said to have wailed, "She was a queen! She was a queen!" ("Sie war eine Königin! Sie war eine Königin!") as he grieved for her. Her gravestone was inscribed: "Oh vase, sign of devotion and obedience."

== Animus and Anima ==
=== On the Nature of the Animus and The Anima as an Elemental Being ===
Animus and Anima is a book published with two of Emma Jung's essays that correlated with her husband's work. The essay "On the Nature of the Animus and the Anima" explores the concepts of animus and anima in Jungian psychology. She delves into the roles these archetypal elements play in the psyche, particularly focusing on their influence on the relationships between men and women. The animus represents the masculine aspects within the female psyche, while the anima represents the feminine aspects within the male psyche. Emma Jung also includes a discussion on how understanding and integrating these aspects can contribute to psychological wholeness and improved interpersonal dynamics.

In "The Anima as an Elemental Being," Emma Jung expands on the anima concept, presenting it as an elemental being that embodies powerful and transformative forces. She explores the symbolic and mythological dimensions of the anima, emphasizing its connection to the natural world and the unconscious. The essay delves into the diverse manifestations of the anima, highlighting its potential for both creative inspiration and destructive chaos. Jung suggests that recognizing and engaging with the anima in its elemental form can lead to a deeper understanding of the psyche and facilitate personal growth.

== Bibliography ==
- Emma Jung (1985). Animus and Anima. Spring Publications. ISBN 978-0-88214-301-9.
- Emma Jung; Marie-Luise von Franz (1998). The Grail Legend. Princeton University Press. ISBN 0-691-00237-1.

=== Works about Emma Jung ===
- Sidney Mullen (1982). C.G. Jung, Emma Jung and Toni Wolff: a collection of remembrances. Analytical Psychology Club of San Francisco. ISBN 9780961123208.
- Elizabeth Clark-Stern (2010). Out of the Shadows: A Story of Toni Wolff and Emma Jung. Fisher King Press. ISBN 978-0-9813939-4-0.
- Imelda Gaudissart (2014). Love and Sacrifice: The Life of Emma Jung. Chiron Publications. ISBN 978-1-63051-086-2.
- Lázaro Droznes (2015). Jung in Love. Unitexto. Digital Publishing. ISBN 978-1-63339-970-9.
- Catrine Clay (2016). Labyrinths: Emma Jung, her Marriage to Carl and the early Years of Psychoanalysis. HarperCollins. ISBN 978-0-0075106-6-5. The book was featured as Book of the Week on BBC Radio 4 2–6 January 2017 in 5 episodes, read by Deborah Findlay and Henry Goodman.
- Ann Conrad Lammers, Thomas Fischer and Medea Hoch (2025). Dedicated to the Soul: The Writings and Drawings of Emma Jung. Princeton University Press. ISBN 9780691253275.
