= Active imagination =

Conscious method of experimentation

Active imagination refers to a process or technique of engaging with the ideas or imaginings of one's mind. It is used as a mental strategy to communicate with the subconscious mind. In Jungian psychology, it is a method for bridging the conscious and unconscious minds. Instead of being linked to the Jungian process, the phrase "active imagination" in modern psychology is most frequently used to describe a propensity to have a very creative and present imagination. It is thought to be a crucial aid in the process of individuation.

== European tradition ==
The theosophy of post-Renaissance Europe embraced imaginal cognition. From Jakob Böhme to Swedenborg, active imagination played a large role in theosophical works. In this tradition, the active imagination serves as an "organ of the soul, thanks to which humanity can establish a cognitive and visionary relationship with an intermediate world".

Samuel Taylor Coleridge, an English philosopher, made a distinction between imagination expressing realities of an imaginal realm above our mundane personal existence and "fancy", or fantasy, which represents the creativity of the artistic soul. For him, "imagination is the condition for cognitive (conscious?) participation in a sacramental universe".

=== Carl Gustav Jung ===
As developed by Carl Jung between 1913 and 1916, active imagination is a meditation technique wherein the contents of one's unconscious are translated into images, narratives, or personified as separate entities. It can serve as a bridge between the conscious "ego" and the unconscious. This often includes working with dreams and the creative self via imagination or fantasy. Jung linked active imagination with the processes of alchemy. Both strive for oneness and inter-relatedness from a set of fragmented and dissociated parts. This process found expression for Jung in his Red Book.

The key to active imagination is restraining the conscious waking mind from exerting influence on internal images as they unfold. For example, if a person were recording a spoken visualization of a scene or object from a dream, Jung's approach would ask the practitioner to observe the scene, watch for changes, and report them, rather than consciously filling the stage with one's desired changes. One would then respond genuinely to these changes and report any further changes in the scene. This approach ensures that the unconscious contents express themselves without undue influence from the conscious mind. At the same time, however, Jung was insistent that some form of active participation in active imagination was essential: "You yourself must enter into the process with your personal reactions: ... as if the drama being enacted before your eyes were real".

Of the origin of active imagination, Jung wrote:

It was during Advent of the year 1913 – December 12, to be exact – I resolved upon the decisive step. I was sitting at my desk once more, thinking over my fears. Then I let myself drop. Suddenly it was as though the ground literally gave way beneath my feet, and I plunged into the dark depths.

Further describing his early personal experience with an active imagination, Jung describes how desires and fantasies of the unconscious mind naturally rise to become conscious. Once they are recognized-realized by the individual, dreams may become "weaker and less frequent," whereas they may have been quite vivid and recurring beforehand.

Jung's use of active imagination was one of several techniques defining his distinctive contribution to the practice of psychotherapy in the period 1912–1960. An active imagination is a method for visualizing unconscious issues by letting them act themselves out. Active imagination can be done by visualization (which is how Jung himself did it), which can be considered similar in technique to shamanic journeying. Active imagination can also be done by automatic writing or by artistic activities such as dance, music, painting, sculpting, ceramics, crafts, etc. Jung considered how, "The patient can make himself creatively independent through this method ... by painting himself he gives shape to himself". Doing active imagination permits the thoughtforms of the unconscious, or inner "self", and of the totality of the psyche, to act out whatever messages they are trying to communicate to the conscious mind.

For Jung, however, this technique had the potential to allow communication between the conscious and unconscious aspects of the personal psyche with its various components and inter-dynamics and between the personal and "collective" unconscious; and therefore was to be embarked upon with due care and attentiveness. Indeed, he warned with respect to "'active imagination' ... The method is not entirely without danger, because it may carry the patient too far away from reality". The post-Jungian Michael Fordham was to go further, suggesting that "active imagination, as a transitional phenomenon ... can be, and often is, both in adults and children put to nefarious purposes and promotes psychopathology. This probably takes place when the mother's impingements have distorted the 'cultural' elements in maturation, and therefore it becomes necessary to analyze childhood and infancy if the distortion is to be shown up."

In partial answer to this critique, James Hillman and Sonu Shamdasani discuss at length the dangers of viewing active imagination solely as an expression of personal content. They propose the technique is easily misunderstood and misdirected when applied to the strictly biographical and should never be used to bridge the personal with the dead. Instead, they suggest, active imagination in Jung's usage was an exposition of the unvoiced influences of the collective unconscious, shedding the terminology of psychology to work directly through mythic images:

SS: ... In reflecting on himself, he does not come across at rock bottom his own personal biography, but it's an attempt to uncover the quintessentially human. These dialogues are not dialogues with his past, as you're indicating [...] But with the weight of human history. [...] And this task of discrimination is what he spent the rest of his life engaged in. Yes, in some sense what happened to him was wholly particular but, in the other sense, it was universally human and that generates his project of the comparative study of the individuation process.

Active imagination removes or highlights traits and characteristics that are often present in the dream. Without a broader perspective, the person working with active imagination may start to see them as their traits. Thus in this continuing effort to stress the importance of what Maslow would come to call the transpersonal, much of Jung's later work was conceived as a comparative historical study of the active imagination and the individuation process in various cultures and epochs, conceived as a normative pattern of human development and the basis of general scientific psychology.

=== Rudolf Steiner ===
Rudolf Steiner suggested cultivating imaginative consciousness through meditative contemplation of texts, objects, or images. The resulting imaginal cognition he believed to be an initial step on a path leading from rational consciousness toward ever-deeper spiritual experience.

The steps following Imagination he termed Inspiration and Intuition. In Inspiration, a meditant clears away all personal content, including even the consciously chosen content of a symbolic form, while maintaining the activity of imagination itself, thus becoming able to perceive the imaginal realm from which this activity stems. In the next step, Intuition, the meditant leverages the connection to the imaginal or angelic realm established via the cognitive imagination while releasing the images mediated via this connection. By ceasing the activity of imaginative consciousness while allowing one's awareness to remain in contact with the archetypal realm, the possibility opens up for an awareness deeper than the imaginal to be conveyed to the open soul by the mediating agents of this realm.

== Islamic tradition ==
In Islamic philosophy the imaginal realm is known as Alam al-Mithal. According to Avicenna, the imagination mediated between, and thus unified, human reason and divine being. This mediating quality manifested in two directions: on the one hand, reason, rising above itself, could attain to the level of active imagination, an activity shared with the lower divine beings. On the other hand, to manifest the concrete forms of the world, divinity created a range of intermediate beings, the angelic co-creators of the universe. According to philosophers of this tradition, the trained imagination can access a "nonspatial fabric" which mediates between the empirical/sensory and the cognitional/spiritual realms.

Through Averroes, mainstream Islamic philosophy lost its relationship to the active imagination. The Sufi movement, as exemplified by Ibn Arabi, continued to explore contemplative approaches to the imaginal realm.

=== Henry Corbin ===
Henry Corbin considered imaginal cognition to be a "purely spiritual faculty independent of the physical organism and thus surviving it". Islamic philosophy in general, and Avicenna and Corbin in particular, distinguish sharply between the true imaginations that stem from the imaginal realm, and personal fantasies, which have a fictional character and are "imaginary" in the common sense of this word. Corbin termed the imagination, which transcended fantasy imaginatio vera.

Corbin suggested that by developing our imaginal perception, we can go beyond mere symbolic representations of archetypes to the point where "new senses perceive directly the order of [supersensible] reality". To accomplish this passage from symbol to reality requires a "transmutation of the being and the spirit" Corbin describes the imaginal realm as "a precise order of reality, corresponding to a precise mode of perception", the "cognitive Imagination" (p. 1). He considered the imaginal realm to be identical with the realm of angels described in many religions, which manifests not only through imaginations but also in people's vocation and destiny.

Corbin (1964) suggests that it is by developing this faculty of cognitive imagination that we can overcome the "divorce between thinking and being."

The imaginal concept was further developed in the Communication Sciences domain. Samuel Mateus (2013) suggested a close link between the imaginary, society, and publicity. The "public imaginal" was named after the dynamic, symbolic, and complex set of diverse and heterogeneous imaginaries that permeate societies.

== Role in scientific and mathematical discovery ==
Hadamard (1954) and Châtelet (1991) suggest that imagination and conceptual experiment play central roles in mathematical creativity. Important scientific discoveries have been made through imaginative cognition, such as Kekulé's famous discovery of the carbon ring structure of benzene through a dream of a snake eating its tail. Other examples include Archimedes, in his bathtub, imagining that his body is nothing but a gourd of water and Einstein imagining himself to be a photon on a horizon of velocities. An example rarely spoken of is Descartes' three dreams, which led to his ideas of mathematics and philosophy, which influenced much of modern thinking.

== See also ==
- Anthroposophy
- Autosuggestion
- Dream interpretation
- Embodied imagination
- Lucid dream
- Thoughtforms
