= Franz Riklin =

Swiss psychiatrist (1878–1938)

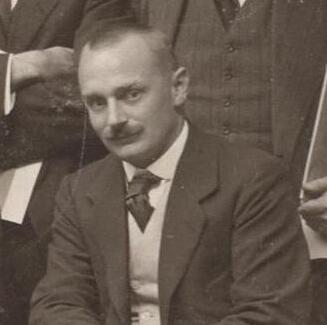
Franz Riklin in 1911

Franz Beda Riklin (Swiss Standard German: [ˈrɪkliːn]; 22 April 1878, St. Gallen – 4 December 1938, Küsnacht) was a Swiss psychiatrist.

Early in his career, Franz Riklin worked at the Burghölzli Hospital in Zurich under Eugen Bleuler (1857–1939), and studied experimental psychology with Emil Kraepelin (1856–1926) and Gustav Aschaffenburg (1866–1944) in Heidelberg. Beginning in 1904, he was a physician at the psychiatric clinic in Rheinau. In 1910, Riklin became the first secretary of the International Psychoanalytic Association (IPA).

Riklin is remembered for his collaboration with Carl Gustav Jung (1875–1961) on word association tests. In 1905, the treatise Experimentelle Untersuchungen über die Assoziationen Gesunder was published as a result of their research. Another important work by Riklin is Wunscherfüllung und Symbolik im Märchen (Wish-Fulfillment and Symbolism in Fairy Tales).

In 1906, Riklin married Sophia Fiechter, a granddaughter of Karl Gustav Jung, thus a cousin of Carl Jung. They had four children. Their son, Franz Niklaus, became an analytical psychologist and a close associate of his uncle, Jung, whose writings he edited.
