= Dream Analysis =

1984 book by Carl Jung

Dream Analysis: Notes of the Seminar Given in 1928–1930
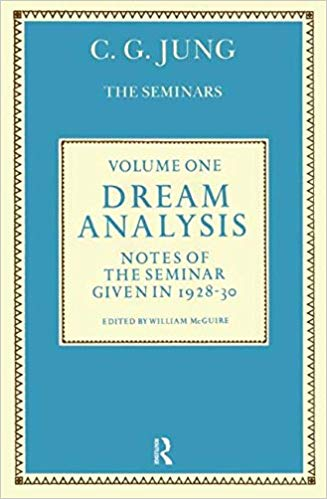
- Editor: Carl Jung
- Language: English
- Subject: Dreams
- Publication date: 1984
- ISBN: 0691098964

Dream Analysis: Notes of the Seminar Given in 1928–1930 is a book by Swiss psychiatrist, Carl Gustav Jung. It was first published in English in 1984. In 1991, it was translated and published in the German language.

Its overall premise is to provide further clarification upon Jung's dream analysis methods. Said dreams include ones from patients who were not previously analyzed in his earlier works.

== English Edition ==
The title written upon the spine is "Seminar on Dream Analysis". It is privately issued in multigraphed form by the Psychology Club Zürich. This edition of Jung's Seminars is being published in the United States by Princeton University Press. In the American edition the volumes of the seminar notes constitute number 99 in the Bollingen series.

Dream Analysis: Notes of the Seminar Given in 1928–1930 includes bibliographical references and index.

== See also ==
- The Collected Works of C. G. Jung
- Dream interpretation
