= Schwabach (disambiguation) =

Schwabach refers to:

- Schwabach, a city in Bavaria, Germany
- Schwabach (Rednitz), a river near Nuremberg in Bavaria, Germany, tributary of the Rednitz
- Schwabach (Regnitz), a river of Bavaria, Germany, tributary of the Regnitz
- Schwabach test, a variant of Rinne test for hearing loss
- Schwabacher, a blackletter typeface

== People with the surname Schwabach ==
- Julius Leopold Schwabach (1831–1898), German banker and diplomat
- Paul von Schwabach (1867–1938), German banker and historian
- Erik-Ernst Schwabach (1891–1938), German publisher and author
- Lally von Schwabach (1898–1954), German writer
- Vera von Schwabach (1899–1996), German-British writer and broadcaster
