= J. W. T. Redfearn =

English Jungian psychologist

Joseph W. T. Redfearn
- Born: 1 January 1921; Wombwell, Yorkshire
- Died: 9 June 2011 (aged 89–90); Brightlingsea, Essex, England
- Resting place: England
- Known for: Contributions to Physiology, Psychiatry and to Analytical Psychology, especially My Self, My Many Selves and The Exploding Self, co-founding the Guild of Psychotherapists
- Spouse: Susan Joy Redfearn
- Children: 6
- Awards: Rockefeller student Johns Hopkins University
- Scientific career
- Fields: Medicine, Physiology, Psychiatry, Analytical psychology
- Workplaces: British Army Medical Services, Graylingwell Hospital, Maudsley Hospital, Society of Analytical Psychology

Joseph William Thorpe Redfearn (1921 – 9 June 2011) was an English army officer, medical physiologist, psychiatrist and analytical psychotherapist and writer.

== Early life ==
Joseph W. T. Redfearn, commonly known as "Joe". was born in Wombwell, where his father had been a butcher. He received a scholarship to Emmanuel College, Cambridge where he gained a Double first in the Natural sciences tripos and Psychology. He was a Rockefeller student at Johns Hopkins University in the United States, leading to an MD. Back in the UK during his National service, he was head of the physiology unit in the army operational research group in the rank of captain. He was obliged to leave his army posting due to developing tuberculosis.

== Career ==
After resigning his army commission in 1952 he spent five years at the clinical psychiatry research unit of Graylingwell Hospital, West Sussex, where along with Olof Lippold and others, he researched depersonalization states and evoked critical potentials in animals, including humans and contributed to numerous scientific papers.

At the invitation of Sir Aubrey Lewis he applied for and gained a post at the Maudsley Hospital in South London where he became a consultant psychotherapist. There, at the suggestion of a colleague, he sought contact with Michael Fordham with whom he entered into psychoanalysis.

=== Contributions to analytical psychology ===
Redfearn became a member of the founding generation of the Society of Analytical Psychology (SAP) and received clinical supervision from German refugee Gerhard Adler, himself trained by Carl Jung in Zürich. Over the course of fifty years, Redfearn treated many analytic patients, became a Training Analyst, supervised trainees, became Chair of the Society (1967–1970) and Director of Training (1971–1983).

His much cited papers published in various journals reflect his enduring concern with the nature of the Self and with the body and his concept of 'subpersonalities'. For instance, his 1982 paper, on persons as things and things as persons, has reverberated in a subsequent work by a philosopher considering ourselves in relation to the built environment. He greatly expanded these and other concerns in two seminal volumes, My Self, My Many Selves and The Exploding Self, a book whose theme could have been expanded into further volumes. It demonstrates how treatment characteristic of SAP practitioners is centred on concern for patients whose breakdown threatens disintegration and who may be on or past the brink of psychosis. In the case of schizophrenia, Redfearn suggests, the explosiveness of psychoid change, which he likens to a nuclear explosion, there is the risk of irreversible fragmentation, or conversely, a path to improved integration.

=== The rift in the SAP ===
Between 1967 and 1976, the SAP was the scene of a lengthy struggle between two theoretical standpoints. One 'classical', led by the Zurich-inspired Adler, the other developmentally and Kleinian inspired led by Fordham. In 1976 the differences proved insuperable and the Adler group left the SAP to form their own separate body. Redfearn found his loyalties severely tested and he went on to develop his own theoretical synthesis. His theoretical exposition may be found in his first book. He agreed with Jung that, 'the goal of psychic development is the self', and he painted mandalas to give expression to this aim.

In 1974 with five other colleagues, among them, Dr. Camilla Bosanquet and Peter Lomas, Redfearn established an independent psychotherapy institution, the Guild of Psychotherapists. It was intended as a pluralist professional programme to foster independence of clinical thought and practice. Redfearn and Bosanquet remained however members of the SAP.

== Family life ==
In 1954 Redfearn married secondly Susan Joy Sainsbury, a theatre sister. Their marriage produced six children and lasted 53 years, until Susan's death in 2007. Redfearn died 9 June 2011, aged 90.

== Publications ==
Among Redfearn's written work are:

- "The patient's experience of his 'Mind'." Journal of Analytical Psychology. 11, 1-20. 1965
- "The captive, the treasure, the hero and the 'anal' stage of development." J. Analyt. Psychol. 24, 185-205. 1979
- "When are things persons and persons things?" J. Analyt. Psychol. 27, 215-238. 1982
- My Self, My Many Selves Academic Press. 1985
- The Exploding Self: The Creative and Destructive Nucleus of the Personality Chiron. 1992
