= Society of Analytical Psychology =

UK based Jungian psychological training organisation founded in 1945

- Society of Analytical Psychology
- Founders: Gerhard Adler, Hella Adler, C.M. Barker, Frieda Fordham, Michael Fordham, Philip Metman, Robert Moody and Lola Paulsen
- Location: 1 Daleham Gardens, London, NW3 5BY
- Website: https://www.thesap.org.uk

The Society of Analytical Psychology, known also as the SAP, incorporated in London, England, in 1945 is the oldest training organisation for Jungian analysts in the United Kingdom. Its first Honorary President in 1946 was Carl Jung. The society was established to professionalise and develop Analytical psychology in the UK by providing training to candidates, offering psychotherapy to the public through the C.G. Jung Clinic and conducting research. By the mid 1970s the society had established a child-focused service and training. The SAP is a member society of the International Association for Analytical Psychology and is regulated by the British Psychoanalytic Council.

In 1955 the society founded and continues as owner of the Journal of Analytical Psychology. Its first editor was Michael Fordham.

== History ==
The institutional roots of analytical psychology in England go back to the 1920s with the Analytical Psychology Club (modelled on the Zurich Psychology Club (1916), descended from the Freud Society (1907)) whose leading light was Dr. H.G. Baynes, but also included members such as Drs. Mary Bell, Esther Harding, Helen Shaw and Adela Wharton. The Tavistock Clinic led by Jung's friend and promoter of his thinking, Hugh Crichton-Miller, had an openness to different streams of research and thought and invited Jung to do a series of lectures in 1935, which were attended by doctors, churchmen and members of the public, including H. G. Wells and Samuel Beckett, but this was not to anchor his thinking directly in the institution.

The professionalisation of analytical psychology needed a number of steps: in 1936 a Medical Society of Analytical Psychology was formed within the Analytical Psychology Club. Among the members was a young medical friend and analysand of Baynes, Michael Fordham. Meanwhile the lay analysts convened their own group in the Club. With the influx during the 1930s of Jewish analysts of all stripes fleeing from Nazi Germany, the Jungians increased to twelve analysts. Meanwhile the Club's Medical Society formulated training standards with Jung's approval. These were then presented to the Medical Section of the British Psychological Society in 1939. The Second World War brought about a hiatus in activity. In 1944 Fordham proposed a Centre for Analytical Psychology. However, in 1943 the British Medical Association had begun to lay down guidelines for treatment, including for mental health in preparation for the eventual demobilisation of medical staff. Added to this, analysts from the British Psychoanalytical Society (founded in 1919) also congregated in the medical section of the British Psychological Society where a rapprochement began between Freudians and Jungians. There were meetings between Kleinians, Middle Group Freudians and Jungians in the 1940s all of which helped to crystallise an impetus for the latter to establish themselves in the Psychotherapy field. Differences between medical and lay analysts were put aside provided the medical analysts (mostly men) supervised the lay analysts (mostly women), and a new society came into being in November 1945. The founders of the SAP were Gerhard Adler, Hella Adler, Dr. C.M. Barker, Frieda and Michael Fordham, Philip Metman, Robert Moody and Lotte Paulsen.

=== Early years ===
Between 1946 and 1953, the society grew rapidly in what has been described as the "halcyon days". The presence at the Maudsley Hospital of Jung's friend and collaborator, the psychiatrist Edward Armstrong Bennet aided the recruitment of the first intake of medical trainees at the SAP in 1947. Among them were Alan Edwards, Robert Hobson, David Howell, Kenneth Lambert, Gordon Stuart Prince, Leopold Stein and Anthony Storr. They were later joined by Frederick Plaut, J.W.T. Redfearn and Louis Zinkin, all of them were to go on to make a notable contribution to the field.

From the beginning the SAP training was structured on clinically professional, as opposed to purely academic, lines so that personal training analysis and supervision were separate and clinical and theoretical teaching was interrelated. This followed closely the model adopted by the Institute of Psychoanalysis and continues to the present day and differs markedly from the approach of the training at the C.G. Jung Institute in Zurich, founded in 1948, which has a more academic emphasis.

=== A British blend ===
The fact that Michael Fordham, the first director of training, was a child psychiatrist of a high intellectual calibre and on close professional terms with colleagues such as Donald Winnicott and Wilfred Bion along with other representatives of the Object Relations School, set the theoretical direction of the course to include a focus on (Kleinian) child development in a manner that had it tagged as the 'London School' or the 'developmental school'. Analysts loyal to the Zurich approach found this to be a deviation from 'classical' (archetypal) Jungian teaching and tensions rose in the organisation. The first to resign was E.A. Bennet in 1963, followed by a major split in 1976 when Gerhard Adler and several other members left to form a separate training body, the Association of Jungian Analysts, AJA, which itself was to split later on. Thomas Kirsch has interpreted the divisions of that era within the SAP as the playing out of the differences between the rationalist philosophical bent of continental Europe, Jung was heavily influenced by Kant, and British Empiricism.

== Some notable members ==
- Gerhard Adler until 1976
- E. A. Bennet until 1963
- Frieda Fordham
- Michael Fordham
- Rosemary Gordon
- Vera von der Heydt
- Judith Hubback
- J. W. T. Redfearn
- Andrew Samuels
- Anthony Storr
- Louis Zinkin

== See also ==
- Child psychotherapy
- British Psychoanalytic Council
- British Psychotherapy Foundation
