= Edward Armstrong Bennet =

English Jungian psychologist

Edward Armstrong Bennet MC, (21 October 1888 – 7 March 1977) was an Anglo-Irish decorated army chaplain during World War I, a British and Indian Army psychiatrist in the rank of brigadier during World War II, hospital consultant and author.

He is known for his long collaboration with Carl Jung which started in the early 1930s and whom he invited to give the influential Tavistock Lectures in London in 1935. He is regarded as one of the earliest practising Jungian analysts in the United Kingdom.

== Education ==
Born in Poyntzpass, County Down Ireland, Bennet was educated at Campbell College, Trinity College, Dublin (twice), and Ridley Hall, Cambridge.

== Career ==
After studying Philosophy and Theology at Trinity College, Dublin, Bennet went to Ridley Hall where he was ordained into the Church of England. During the First World War he served as a military chaplain and was awarded the Military Cross for "conspicuous bravery". After hostilities ended he returned to Trinity College, Dublin where he qualified in Medicine in 1925. In 1925 he moved to London, where he obtained a post in the West End Hospital for Nervous Diseases. He also joined the Tavistock Clinic, then led by Hugh Crichton-Miller, as an honorary psychiatrist. In the early 1930s he met the Swiss psychiatrist, Carl Jung and invited him to London to give the "Tavistock lectures" in 1935. He was awarded a Doctor of Science degree in 1939.

During World War II Bennet served a command psychiatrist in India and in the 11th Army Group. He was promoted to brigadier. After the war he resumed his close collaboration with Jung which lasted until the latter's death in 1961. He also joined the Royal Bethlem and the Maudsley Hospitals where he remained until his retirement in 1955. He carried on a private practice and was active on church and medical committees. Bennet was for a time a member of the newly formed Society of Analytical Psychology, but fell out with its leader, Michael Fordham. There was a brief reconciliation, however, Bennet resigned permanently in 1963.

=== Committee work ===
He served on:

- The Hypnotism Sub-committee of the BMA 1955–6
- The Archbishop of Canterbury's Commission on Spiritual Healing 1954–5
- The Drug addiction Committee of the BMA 1955-6

=== Personal ===
Bennet was married to Eveline, his co-author of Meetings with Jung.

== Publications ==
In English:

- What Jung Really Said. Schocken Books; 4th Revised edition (1 July 1995) ISBN 978-0805210460
- C.G. Jung. Chiron, 2006 ISBN 9781888602357
- Meetings with Jung: Conversations Recorded During the Years, 1946-1961. Daimon Books, 1992 ISBN 9783856305017
- “Hysteria, a Disorder of Social Integration”, (Thesis), Bennet, E. A., 1930.
- The Quality of Leadership (Paper)
- "The Psychopathology of Sexual Perversions". E. A. Bennet, M.C., M.D., D.P.M. Journal of the Royal Society of Medicine. June 1, 1933

https://doi.org/10.1177/003591573302600826

In translation:

- Jung og hans tankeverden
- Τι είπε στ' αλήθεια ο Γιούνγκ
- A normalização como instrumento de inovação e competitividade na MPE
- Ce que jung a vraiment dit

== See also ==
Marion Woodman
