= British Psychotherapy Foundation =

Organisation in the United Kingdom

- Abbreviation: Bpf
- Formation: (1951) 2013
- Type: Learned society
- Headquarters: 37 Mapesbury Road, London NW2 4HJ
- Region served: United Kingdom
- Members: c. 800
- Affiliations: British Psychoanalytic Council
- Website: www.britishpsychotherapyfoundation.org.uk

The British Psychotherapy Foundation (bpf) is a United Kingdom-based psychotherapy membership, training, and clinical services organisation, and one of the UK's leading training providers and membership bodies for people working in intensive psychoanalytic psychotherapy, Jungian analysis, and child and adolescent psychotherapy. It is the successor organisation to three former long-established British psychotherapy providers and clinical training institutions which merged in April 2013. The original constituents are the British Association of Psychotherapists, BAP (1951), The Lincoln Clinic and Centre for Psychotherapy (1968) and the London Centre for Psychotherapy, LCP, (1976). The merger created a unique single professional body able to offer training across four psychotherapy disciplines: psychoanalysis, psychoanalytic psychotherapy, Jungian analysis, and child and adolescent psychotherapy. It has approximately 800 members, comprising around 400 qualified members and 400 trainee members. It is registered as a charity in England and Wales (charity number 1150806, company number 08238969). It is a member of the British Psychoanalytic Council, through which individual members are regulated to practise. Its current associations are:

- British Jungian Analytic Association (BJAA), a member society of the International Association for Analytical Psychology
- Independent Psychoanalytic Child and Adolescent Psychotherapy Association (IPCAPA)
- Psychoanalytic Psychotherapy Association (PPA)

== History ==
The bpf was incorporated as a company limited by guarantee on 3 October 2012, with operations commencing on 1 April 2013, on which date the activities and assets of the three founding organisations were formally transferred to the new body. The merger was described at the time as creating "a strong professional organisation, providing access to treatment for the public, comprehensive support to our members and education and training to the next generation of psychotherapists."

The collaboration between the bpf and Birkbeck, University of London predates the merger: the MSc in Psychodynamics of Human Development was established in 1996 as a joint programme between Birkbeck and the British Association of Psychotherapists.

Until it de-merged in 2019, the British Psychoanalytic Association had been a fourth constituent of the bpf, having previously been integral to the British Association of Psychotherapists.

The organisation is governed by a Board of Trustees, largely elected by its membership, including the Chair of each of the three member associations. A small number of lay and external trustees may also be appointed. These governance provisions were established in a revision to the charity's Articles of Association carried out in 2019.

== Oliver Sacks ==
The bpf is based at 37 Mapesbury Road, London NW2 4HJ, the childhood home of the neurologist and author Oliver Sacks (1933–2015). Sacks grew up at the address, the youngest of four sons of Samuel Sacks, a general practitioner, and Muriel Elsie Landau, one of the first female surgeons in England. The family home also served as his father's medical practice, and Samuel Sacks continued to practise medicine at the address until shortly before his death in 1990, when the house was sold. In 1945, at the age of twelve, Sacks took a stereographic photograph from his bedroom window at the junction of Mapesbury Road and Exeter Road, which he later described in an essay for Tate magazine. Sacks described his Mapesbury Road childhood in his memoirs Uncle Tungsten: Memories of a Chemical Boyhood (2001) and On the Move: A Life (2015).

== Training and Education ==
The bpf offers psychotherapy training programmes across five levels: pre-qualification and foundation courses, qualifying training, post-qualification specialist training, accredited degrees, and professional development. All training is accredited by the British Psychoanalytic Council (BPC) and the Association of Child Psychotherapists (ACP). Courses are delivered from campuses in London (Kilburn) and Newcastle upon Tyne, as well as online and in hybrid formats.

The bpf jointly delivers the MSc in Psychodynamics of Human Development with Birkbeck, University of London, offered in both psychoanalytic and Jungian analytic streams. This programme serves as a pre-clinical foundation and fulfils the entry requirements for Child and Adolescent Psychotherapy doctoral training.

The bpf's IPCAPA jointly delivers the Doctorate in Child and Adolescent Psychotherapy (DPsych) with the Anna Freud Centre and University College London. This four-year full-time programme leads to the award of DPsych and professional membership of the Association of Child Psychotherapists (ACP).

The University of Exeter offers the Doctor of Psychodynamic/Psychoanalytic Psychotherapy Clinical Practice (DPPClinPrac), a part-time professional doctorate accredited by the BPC. Graduates of the programme become members of the bpf upon qualification.

== Clinical Services ==
The bpf operates a Clinical Service providing access to psychotherapy for individuals, couples, and children. Services include a Low Fee Scheme offering once-weekly therapy from £10 per session and intensive three-times-weekly therapy, delivered by advanced trainees under clinical supervision. A directory of fully qualified bpf member therapists is also available to the public.

== Publications ==
The bpf co-owns and publishes the British Journal of Psychotherapy with John Wiley & Sons, a peer-reviewed academic journal founded in 1984 (ISSN 0265-9883, eISSN 1752-0118). Ownership was acquired through the British Association of Psychotherapists in 2006. The journal is edited by Susan Kegerreis of the University of Essex. It publishes psychoanalytic and Jungian-analytic scholarship focused on work with the unconscious in individual, group, and institutional practice, and welcomes submissions from clinicians at an early stage of their careers as well as international contributors. As of 2023, 6,748 institutions worldwide offered access to the journal.

== Notable members ==
- Rosemary Gordon
- Carol Topolski
- Clare Winnicott
- Hester McFarland Solomon
- Brett Kahr, Professor of Psychoanalysis and Mental Health at Regent's University London, author of the first biography of D. W. Winnicott and winner of the Gradiva Prize for Biography
- Jean Knox, psychiatrist and Jungian analyst, Chair of the Trustees of the bpf, Honorary Associate Professor at the University of Exeter, and former Editor-in-Chief of the Journal of Analytical Psychology
- Lydia Tischler, child psychotherapist trained by Anna Freud, first child psychotherapist at the Cassel Hospital, and co-founder of the European Federation of Psychoanalytic Psychotherapy
- Laurence Spurling, psychoanalytic psychotherapist, Senior Lecturer in Psychosocial Studies at Birkbeck, University of London, and author of several books on psychotherapy practice including On Becoming a Psychotherapist and The Making of a Counsellor

== See also ==
- British Psychoanalytic Council
- British Psychoanalytical Society
- Mental health in the United Kingdom
- Psychoanalytic infant observation
- Society of Analytical Psychology
