= Hester McFarland Solomon =

American British psychologist (1943–2021)

- Born: Hester Madeleine McFarland; 11 February 1943; New Haven, Connecticut
- Died: 5 October 2021 (aged 78); London
- Burial place: London
- Education: Tufts University, Massachusetts
- Occupation: Analytical psychologist
- Years active: 1977–2021
- Known for: The as if personality, the ethical attitude

Hester McFarland Solomon (11 February 1943 – 5 October 2021) was an American and British analytical psychologist, researcher, teacher and administrator. She sought to bridge the century-old divide between Analytical psychology and the schools of Psychoanalysis.

== Family and early life ==
Hester McFarland, the elder of two children, was born a war baby in New Haven, Connecticut into modest circumstances. Her mother, a nurse, was of recent Polish descent, while her father, Orrin, a small building contractor, came from a Scottish family, mainly of physicians, long settled in the United States. During her early childhood, the family moved from a converted garage into a timber house in the forest, which her father had constructed. She excelled at school and French literature became her chosen subject. The family's budget did not stretch to college fees and she set off to New York City to work as a secretary to finance her desire for further studies. She succeeded in gaining a scholarship to Tufts University, where she majored in French. While there, the Junior Year Abroad Program enabled her to travel to Europe and take courses at the Sorbonne in Paris. It also presented an opportunity to visit London where she met the man who would later become her husband, Jonathan Solomon. Solomon, a Cambridge graduate, would go on to have a distinguished career as a top ranking civil servant during the privatisation of British telecommunications. Having graduated in the early 1960s, Hester McFarland moved to the United Kingdom and marriage. She continued her French studies and obtained a master's degree at King's College London. This was followed by the birth of a son. However her abiding interest in philosophy and in the writings of Carl Jung propelled her into abandoning her French studies and forging instead a career in the application of Analytical psychology.

== Career ==
Solomon entered her clinical career at a propitious time in London when independent analytical societies were recently formed and analysts retained direct links with Jung and his immediate circle. She rose through the ranks of her own society, the British Association of Psychotherapists (later the British Jungian Analytic Association), becoming chair of the Council and a Fellow. Her international connections took her not only to Europe, especially France and Belgium, where she gave papers, but also travel to China and Japan. Her organisational skills were recognised in 2010 by her election, as only the second woman, to the presidency of the Zürich-based International Association for Analytical Psychology. Towards the end of her life, with faltering health, she fostered the running of the amalgamated British Psychotherapy Foundation operating in a competitive independent therapy environment against a declining NHS and economy.

=== Analytical psychology ===
Solomon became a sought after analyst and clinical supervisor in London. Her experience and academic skill were deployed in a number of publications. This was adumbrated already in 1972, when hired in a secretarial capacity by psychiatrist Dr. Jack Kahn for his forthcoming textbook, he acknowledged her as his "co-author" when the work was finally published. This collaboration later led to editing two volumes of collected papers with Elphis Christopher at the turn of the 20th century and a further joint project with psychoanalyst, Mary Twyman, on the ethics of clinical practice which they argue are common to both analytical psychology and psychoanalysis, despite apparently insurmountable theoretical differences on the nature of the psyche and its hypothetical functioning. Another focus of Solomon's was the type of defences people develop to get through life. One of them she characterised as the as if personality, a type of layered construct to protect the vulnerable true self within. Solomon welcomed the 2009 publication of Jung's long detained Liber Novus as the basis of his clinical theories and to which she devoted much study.

== Selected publications ==
- Christopher, Elphis; Solomon, Hester McFarland, eds. (2000). Jungian Thought in the Modern World. London: Free Association Books.
- Christopher, Elphis; Solomon, Hester McFarland, eds. (2002). Contemporary Jungian Clinical Practice. London: Routledge.
- Solomon, Hester McFarland; & Twyman, Mary, eds. (2003). The Ethical Attitude in Analytic Practice. London: Free Association Books. ISBN 1-85343-558-9.

Solomon published her professional papers in:

- Solomon, Hester McFarland (2007). The Self in Transformation. Routledge. ISBN 978-0-367-32876-4.
