= Rosemary Gordon =

British psychologist

- Born: 1 January 1918; Germany
- Died: 17 January 2012 (aged 93–94); Menerbes, France
- Resting place: France
- Known for: Contributions to Analytical Psychology, especially Dying and Creating, a Search for Meaning, 1978.
- Scientific career
- Fields: Anthropology, Clinical psychology, Analytical psychology
- Workplaces: Sorbonne University, University of London

Rosemary Gordon (1918 Germany – 17 January 2012, Menerbes, France) was a naturalised British academic, clinical psychologist and analytical psychologist and writer. She was a fellow of the Royal Anthropological Institute of Great Britain and Ireland and of the British Psychological Society and an honorary fellow of the Centre for Psychoanalytic Studies at the University of Kent.

After schooling in Switzerland, Gordon came to London where she took a degree in psychology and later gained a doctorate at the University of London. She undertook anthropological research into family constellations at the Sorbonne in Paris. On returning to England her work in clinical psychology centred on projective testing.

She became interested in the possibilities of psychoanalysis and undertook an analysis with the Kleinian Hanna Segal. However she found its premises on instinctual drives too limiting and turned to analytical psychology instead. She became a member of the London Society of Analytical Psychology in 1957 of which she was later to become the chair. She was co-editor with Michael Fordham and Kenneth Lambert of a series of clinical textbooks published by the Society of Analytical Psychology and later the editor of the Journal of Analytical Psychology (1986–1994). She did not abandon entirely her interest in the British Independent group, in particular the work of Melanie Klein and Donald Winnicott. With her colleague Judith Hubback she set up the "Freud-Jung Group" which met for years to exchange ideas between members of the British Psychoanalytical Society and the Society of Analytical Psychology. Aside from her many articles, she wrote two significant volumes, Dying and Creating, a Search for Meaning (1978) in which she explored the symbolic process and the variations she found in the conceptualisations of C. G. Jung and Sigmund Freud. Her last book was Bridges, Metaphor for Psychic Processes (1993), which gathered together the writings of a professional lifetime. She was a clinician, supervisor and lecturer.

== Personal life ==
In 1950, Rosemary Gordon married an intelligence officer and future BBC producer, Peter Montagnon, and was then known as Rosemary Gordon‐Montagnon. They spent their retirement in rural Southern France where she predeceased him in 2012.

== See also ==
- William P. Kraemer

== Bibliography ==
- Dying and Creating, a Search for Meaning. London: Society of Analytical Psychology. 1978. ISBN 0-9505983-0-5
- Bridges, Metaphor for Psychic Processes London: Taylor and Francis. 1993. ISBN 978-1855750265
- A Very Private World', The Function and Nature of Imagery. London and New York: Academic Press Ltd, 1972 /12 Wellcome Library Archives
- Student Unrest II Students and the New Ethic ts, n.d. Wellcome Library Archives
