= William P. Kraemer =

Analytical psychologist

- Born: Wilhelm Gunther Paul Kraemer; 1911; Germany
- Died: 1983 (aged 71–72); United Kingdom
- Occupations: academic writer, school master
- Writing career
- Language: English
- Movement: Analytical psychology

William P. Kraemer (1911 - 1983) was a German analytical psychologist. He edited The Forbidden Love: The Normal and Abnormal Love of Children (1976), a collection of four essays by him, Rosemary Gordon, Kenneth Lambert and Mary Williams. He also wrote The enemy within-without: Psychotherapy and Morals. He was a member of the council of the Society of Analytical Psychology.

Kraemer began his academic career in Italy after escaping Nazi persecution. He was a master at Lancing College, in Britain, for four years. He spent the rest of his life in the United Kingdom. His brother was the American military educator and advisor Fritz G. A. Kraemer.

== See also ==
- Photos of Kraemer in the National Portrait Gallery Collection
