= Judith Hubback =

British analytical psychologist

- Born: Eläis Judith Fischer Williams; 23 February 1917
- Died: 6 January 2006 (aged 88)
- Education: Newnham College, Cambridge
- Occupation: Analytical psychologist
- Spouse: David Hubback
- Children: 3

Judith Hubback (born Eläis Judith Fischer Williams; 23 February 1917 – 6 January 2006) was a British analytical psychologist and sociologist noted for her early studies into women and work.

== Early life and family ==
Eläis Judith Fischer Williams was born on 23 February 1917, the third daughter of the international lawyer Sir John Fischer Williams, CBE, KC (1870–1947) and his wife, the artist Eleanor Marjorie Hay Murray (1880–1961). Her elder sister was the historian and civil servant Jenifer Margaret Hart, the wife of H. L. A. Hart). Hubback grew up in Paris and learned to speak French fluently. She studied at Newnham College, Cambridge, graduating in 1936 with a first-class honours degree in history. While at university, she met David Hubback (who died in 1991), the son of Eva Hubback. They married in 1939 and together had two daughters and one son.

== Career ==
=== Teaching, married life and social studies ===
Hubback was a teacher until her first child was born; she had faced discrimination while applying for teaching posts as a married woman and was frustrated that she could not learn details of her husband's work because, as a civil servant, he was required to keep it confidential. With the end of the Second World War, employment opportunities for women (which had been substantially expanded to meet wartime demands) contracted; the social expectations that women would become full-time mothers once they had children also acted as a cultural barrier to employment. In the late 1940s, Hubback became aware of her mother-in-law, Eva Hubback's, social studies on working-class housewives and took an interest in replies to her surveys. She became increasingly interested in women's attitudes toward work and self-funded postal surveys as part of a project to explore the lives of highly educated, married women in the UK. In 1954, she published the results of her surveys as a pamphlet, Graduate Wives, which attracted coverage in national newspapers. In 1957, she followed up Graduate Wives with the book: Wives Who Went to College, which was described by The Guardian as "considerably ahead of its time".

In the words of the historian Helen McCarthy, Hubback was one of a number of researchers in the 1950s (such as Viola Klein, Pearl Jephcott, Ferdynand Zweig, Nancy Seear and Hannah Gavron) who "helped to entrench new understandings of married women’s employment as a fundamental feature of advanced industrial societies, and one that solved the dilemmas of ‘modern’ woman across social classes." She reported the frustrations of highly qualified women who felt constrained to stop working once they married or to care for their children; she concluded that women who sacrificed themselves and their capacity for self-actualisation to become full-time mothers and wives instead were "often too self-sacrificing in the sense that they let themselves drift into a state of mind in which their daily lives gradually destroy them as individuals". Hubback argued that women could balance motherhood, marriage and work only through the full support of their husbands. Wives Who Went to College was the subject of much discussion: it received 87 reviews in published material and was the subject of leading articles in The Times and The Economist.

=== Analytical psychology and later life ===
Despite her work (which included freelance broadcasting and journalism), she continued to feel deeply unsatisfied with aspects of her life: "she was unsatisfied and sometimes depressed, knowing that she had unrealised potential." She visited Robert Hobson, a Jungian psychoanalyst, and became sufficiently interested in the subject that she qualified with the Society of Analytical Psychology in 1964. Before that she somewhat questionably worked as a counselor at University College, London before she was qualified, thanks to her friendship with Arnold Linken, the South African immigrant medical director. She was not equipped to deal with issues of students' social mobility, of a kind she had not herself experienced in her privileged upbringing, particularly those of male working-class students. She was more happily involved with the Society than with having to slum it amongst the real-life problems of non-Oxbridge non-middle-class students. She served as its Honorary Secretary for a time, as co-editor of the Journal of Analytical Psychology (1976–85) and as the Society's representative on the committee of the International Association for Analytical Psychology (1986–92).

In 1997, she donated her papers to the Women's Library Archive at the London School of Economics.

Hubback died on 6 February 2006 and was survived by her three children. Her husband predeceased her.

=== BBC TV appearance ===
Hubback was a contributor to a BBC programme "The Meaning of Dreams", presented by comedian and naturalist Bill Oddie. It was broadcast on 16 April 1986.

== Publications ==
Hubback published her professional papers in 1988 as:

- People Who Do Things to Each Other

Her literary output includes:

- Islands and People (1964), containing poetry
- The Sea Has Many Voices (1990), a novel which received the Society of Authors' Sagittarius prize in 1991.
- From Dawn to Dusk (2003), an autobiography
