= Peter Montagnon =

Peter Ernest Arnold Montagnon (24 April 1925 – 27 October 2017) was a British Army officer, operative for the Secret Intelligence Service (MI6), and later a television producer. He was the first head of the BBC's Open University Production Centre. He was married for over fifty years to the influential analytical psychologist, Rosemary Gordon. They retired to France where he died.

== Selected television productions ==
- Parliamo Italiano (1963)
- Civilisation (1969) (with Michael Gill)
- The Roaring Silence (1973)
- The Long Search (1977)
- The Heart of the Dragon (1985)
