= Vera von der Heydt =

British Jungian psychologist

- Born: 11 December 1899; Berlin, Germany
- Died: 14 November 1996 (aged 96)
- Occupations: Jungian analyst, writer, broadcaster
- Spouse: Eduard von der Heydt (m. 1918; div. 1927)
- Parent(s): Paul von Schwabach; Eleanor Schröder
- Relatives: Lally Horstmann (sister); Julius Leopold Schwabach (grandfather); Erik-Ernst Schwabach (cousin)

Baroness Vera von der Heydt, née von Schwabach, (11 December 1899 – 14 November 1996) was a German born British Jungian analyst, writer and broadcaster. She was one of the last surviving of Carl Jung's analysands and correspondents.

== Biography ==
Vera Schwabach was born into a wealthy Berlin banking family. She was the second daughter, after Lally von Schwabach, of the Jewish Berlin financier, Paul von Schwabach. Her mother, Eleanor Schröder a Christian from a Hamburg banking family, had Irish ancestry. She was the granddaughter of banker Julius Leopold Schwabach. On 11.12.1918 she married Baron Eduard von der Heydt, a German and Swiss banker and patron of the arts. The marriage ended in divorce in 1927; there were no children. She returned to live with her family.

In 1927 she met Carl Jung for the first time while co-hosting a formal dinner. Their connection did not develop until much later during World War II. With the rise of antisemitism in Germany, von der Heydt decided in 1933 to move to the United Kingdom where she had friends. In 1937 von der Heydt was received into the Roman Catholic church by Fr. Martin D'Arcy SJ in Oxford. She entered also into a first analysis with John Layard. At his suggestion, she travelled to Zürich and began a training analysis with Jolande Jacobi and subsequently with Jung himself. She became a close associate of Jung's family and his circle. She would later attend Jung's funeral in Switzerland. In 1943 she moved to Edinburgh to work at the Davidson Clinic run by the Jung follower, Dr. Winifred Rushforth.

On her return to London in 1951, she had further analysis with Gerhard Adler and joined the Society of Analytical Psychology. She set up a clinical practice and became a sought after lecturer on psychology and spirituality and was a leading member and Fellow (1962) of the Guild of Pastoral Psychology. She wrote several volumes and made radio and television appearances. Her descendants include the Leigh Von Schwabach and von der Heydt lines in the US.

== Writings ==
- Prospects for the Soul Soundings in Jungian Psychology and Religion (Paperback) ISBN 9780232513387
- Psychology and the Care of Souls (Paperback)
- Fathers and Mothers Five Papers on the Archetypal Background of Family Psychology (Paperback) ISBN 9780882143064
- Alchemy (Paperback)
- On Psychic Energy (Paperback)
- On the Animus (Paperback)
- Modern Myth (Paperback)
- Father (Paperback)
- Ezekiel and the Vision of the Dry Bones (Paperback)
- Jung and Religion (Paperback)
- Fathers and Mothers Five Papers on the Archetypal Background of Family Psychology
