= Civilisation (TV series) =

British documentary TV series on Western art and philosophy (BBC 1969)

- Title card from Episode 1, "The Skin of Our Teeth"
- Also known as: Civilisation: A Personal View by Kenneth Clark
- Genre: Television documentary
- Developed by: David Attenborough
- Presented by: Sir Kenneth Clark
- Composer: Edwin Astley
- Country of origin: United Kingdom
- Original language: English
- No. of episodes: 13

Production
- Producers: Michael Gill; Peter Montagnon
- Cinematography: A.A. Englander
- Editor: Allan Tyrer
- Camera setup: Kenneth Macmillan
- Running time: 650 minutes
- Production company: BBC Television

Original release
- Network: BBC2
- Release: 23 February – 18 May 1969

Civilisation: A Personal View by Kenneth Clark is a 1969 British television documentary series written and presented by the art historian Sir Kenneth Clark.

Its thirteen episodes outline the history of Western art, architecture and philosophy since the Dark Ages. It was produced by the BBC and aired from February to May 1969 on BBC2. Then, and in later transmissions in Britain, the United States and other countries, it reached an unprecedented number of viewers for an art series. Its production standards were praised and set the pattern for subsequent television documentary series. The New Yorker described it as revelatory for the general viewer.

Clark's 1969 book Civilisation: A Personal View, based on the series, has never been out of print, and the BBC's DVD issue of the series in 2005 has remained in the catalogues.

== Background ==
Clark had pioneered British television series about art, beginning in 1958, with Is Art Necessary?, an experimental series for the commercial broadcaster Associated Television. Over the next eight years Clark wrote and presented series and one-off programmes on the visual arts, ranging from Caravaggio to Pieter Bruegel the Elder, Rembrandt, Francisco Goya, Vincent van Gogh and Pablo Picasso, and a co-production for commercial television and the BBC, Royal Palaces.

In 1966 David Attenborough, the controller of the BBC's new second television channel, BBC2, was in charge of introducing colour broadcasting in Britain. He conceived the idea of a series about great paintings as the standard-bearer for colour television, and thought Clark would be the best presenter for it. Clark was attracted by the suggestion, but at first declined to commit himself. He later recalled that what convinced him to take part was Attenborough's use of the word "civilisation" to sum up what the series would be about.

I had no clear idea what "civilisation" meant, but thought it was preferable to barbarism, and fancied that this was the moment to say so.

— Clark on the genesis of Civilisation

The series consists of thirteen programmes, each fifty minutes long, written and presented by Clark, covering western European civilisation from the end of the Dark Ages to the early twentieth century. As the civilisation under consideration excludes Graeco-Roman, Asian and other historically important cultures, a title was chosen that disclaimed comprehensiveness: Civilisation: A Personal View by Kenneth Clark. Clark later commented, "I didn't suppose that anyone would be so obtuse as to think that I had forgotten about the great civilisations of the pre-Christian era and the East. However, I confess the title has worried me. It would have been easy in the eighteenth century: Speculations on the Nature of Civilisation as illustrated by the Phases of Civilised Life in Western Europe from the Dark Ages to Present Day. Unfortunately, this is no longer practicable." Although the series focused chiefly on the visual arts and architecture, there were substantial sections about drama, literature, music, philosophy and socio-political movements. Clark wanted to include more about law and philosophy, but "I could not think of any way of making them visually interesting."

After initial mutual antipathy, Clark and his principal director, Michael Gill, established a congenial working relationship. They and their production team spent three years from 1966 filming in one hundred and seventeen locations in thirteen countries. The filming was to the highest technical standards of the day, and quickly went over budget; it cost £500,000 by the time it was complete. Attenborough rejigged his broadcasting schedules to spread the cost, transmitting each episode twice during the thirteen-week run.

== Series outline ==
=== 1. The Skin of Our Teeth ===
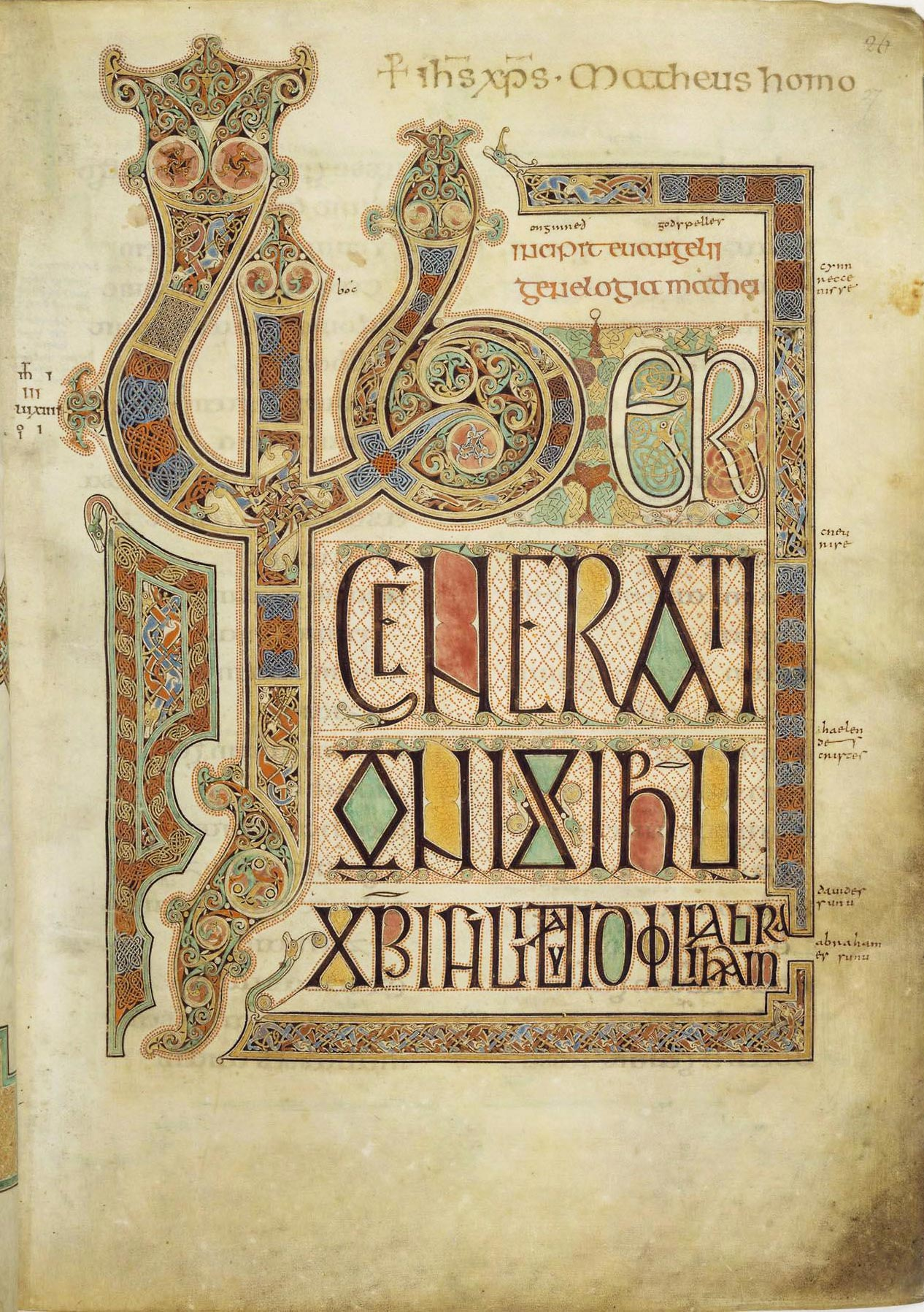
First page of the Gospel of Matthew in the Lindisfarne Gospels

In this first episode Clark—travelling from Byzantine Ravenna to the Celtic Hebrides, from the Norway of the Vikings to Charlemagne's Palatine Chapel at Aachen—tells the story of the Dark Ages, the six centuries following the fall of the Western Roman Empire, and "how European thought and art were saved 'by the skin of our teeth'".

- Expressions of an Ideal
- The Fall of Rome
- Skellig Michael
- Iona
- The Norsemen
- The Baptistry at Poitiers
- Charlemagne
- The Cross of Lothar

(US broadcast title: The Frozen World)

=== 2. The Great Thaw ===
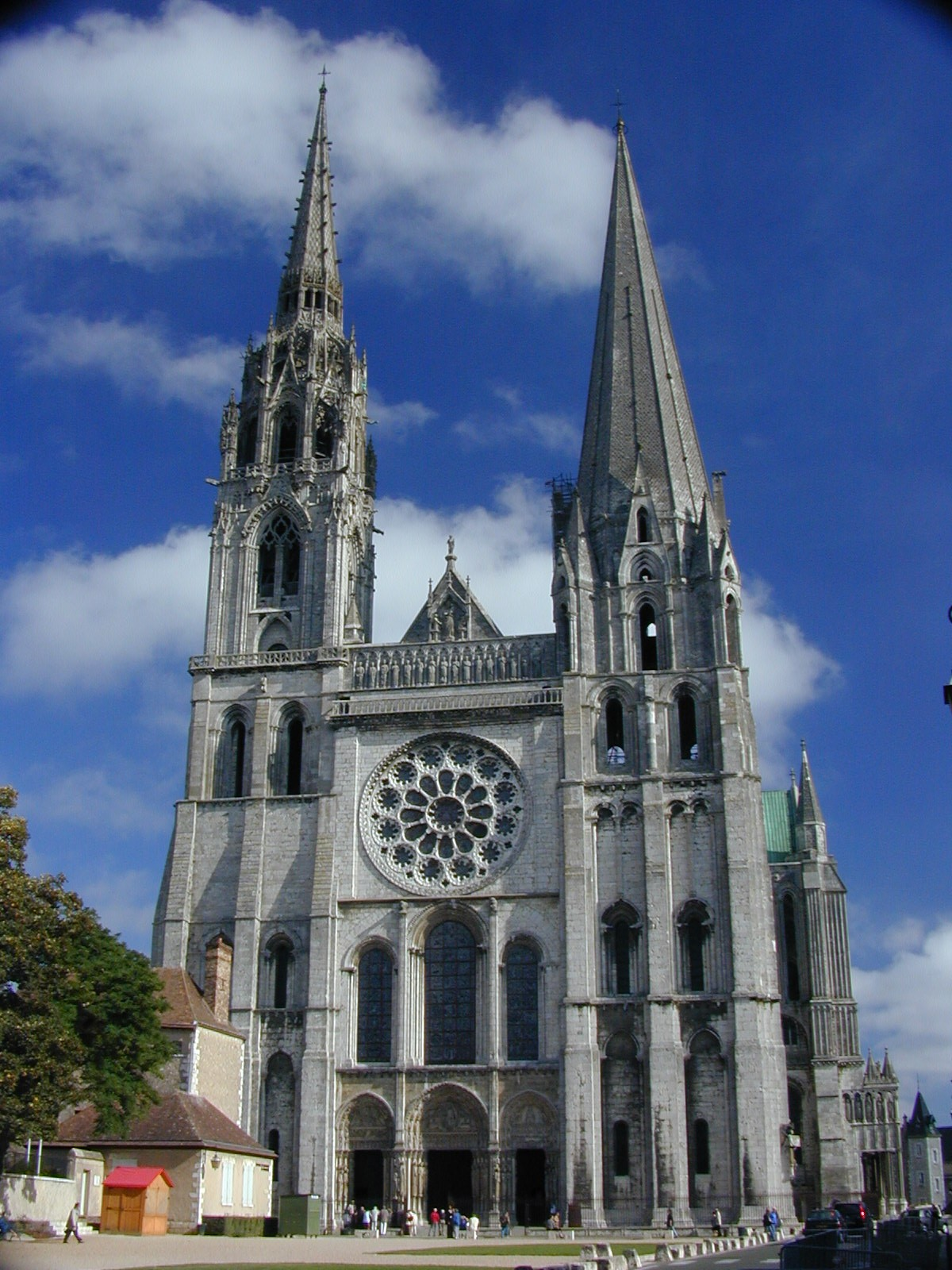
Chartres Cathedral

Clark tells of the sudden reawakening of European civilisation in the 12th century. He traces it from its first manifestations in Cluny Abbey to the Basilica of Saint-Denis and finally to its high point, the building of Chartres Cathedral in the early 13th century.

- The Triumph of the Church
- the Abbeys of Cluny and Moissac
- St Bernard of Clairvaux
- St Foy
- The Abbey of Vézelay
- Gislebertus
- The Abbey of St Denis
- Abbot Suger
- Chartres

=== 3. Romance and Reality ===
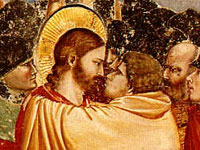
Giotto's The Kiss of Judas

Beginning at the Château de Sully-sur-Loire by the river Loire in France and then travelling through the hills of Tuscany and Umbria to the Pisa Baptistery at Pisa, Clark examines the aspirations and achievements of the Late Middle Ages in 14th-century France and Italy.

- The Gothic Spirit
- Courtly Love
- The Siege of the Castle of Love
- The Duke of Berry
- St Francis of Assisi
- Civic Life
- Giotto
- Dante and Pisano

=== 4. Man: the Measure of all Things ===
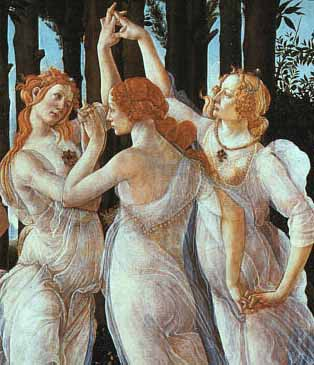
Sandro Botticelli's The Three Graces

Visiting Florence, Clark argues that European thought gained a new impetus from its rediscovery of its classical past in the 15th century. He visits the palaces at Urbino and Mantua and other centres of (Renaissance) civilisation.

- Early Renaissance
- Leonardo Bruni
- David (Donatello)
- Perspective
- Leon Battista Alberti
- Jan van Eyck
- Botticelli
- The Palace of Urbino
- The Court of Mantua
- A Civilised Countryside

=== 5. The Hero as Artist ===
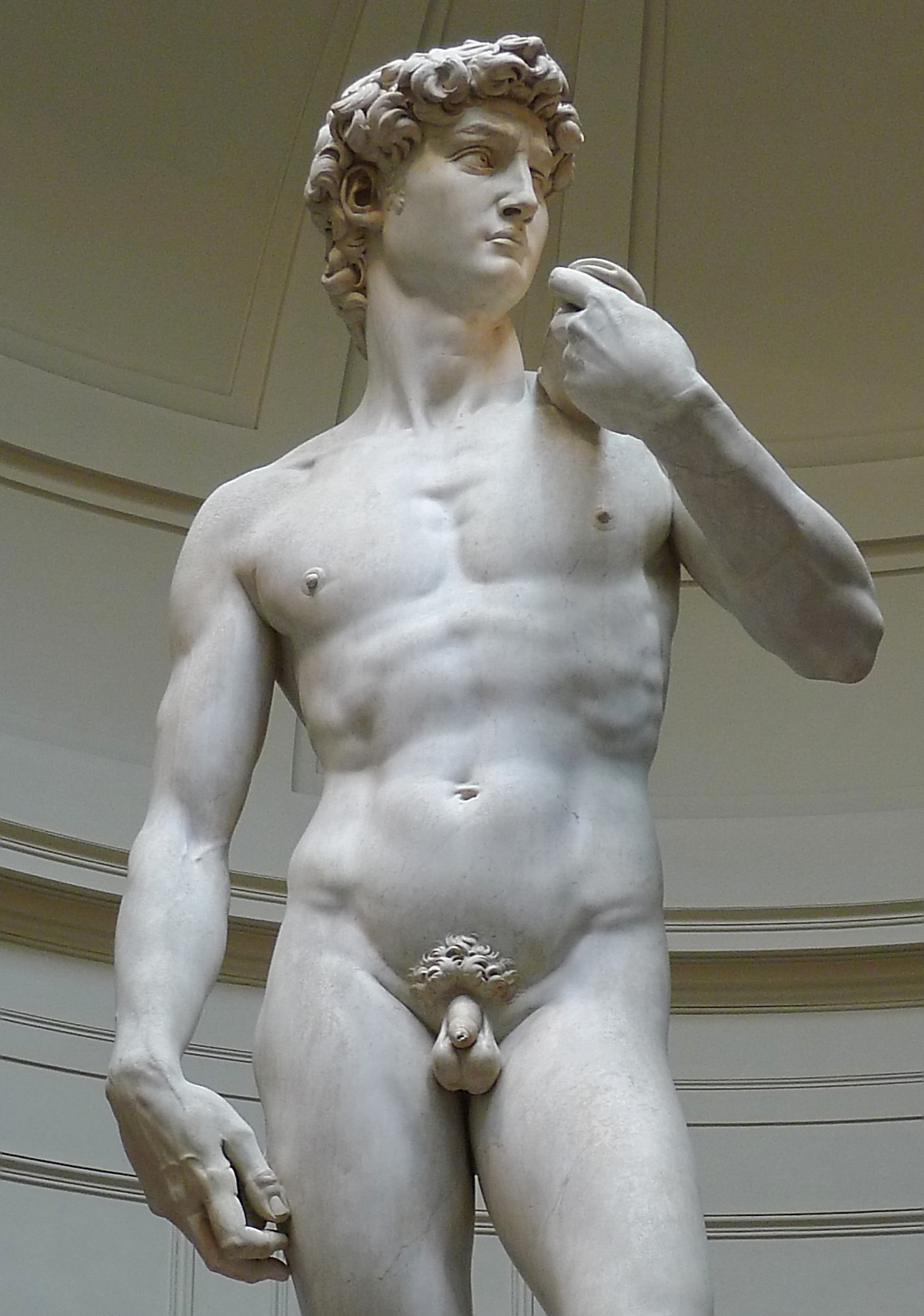
Michelangelo's David

Clark takes the viewer back to 16th-century papal Rome—noting the convergence of Christianity and antiquity. He discusses Michelangelo, Raphael, and Leonardo da Vinci; the courtyards of the Vatican; the rooms decorated for the Pope by Raphael; and the Sistine Chapel.

- Giants and Heroes
- The Decadence of the Popes
- Michelangelo
- Bound Captives
- The Sistine Chapel
- Raphael
- Leonardo da Vinci
- Man as a Mechanism

=== 6. Protest and Communication ===
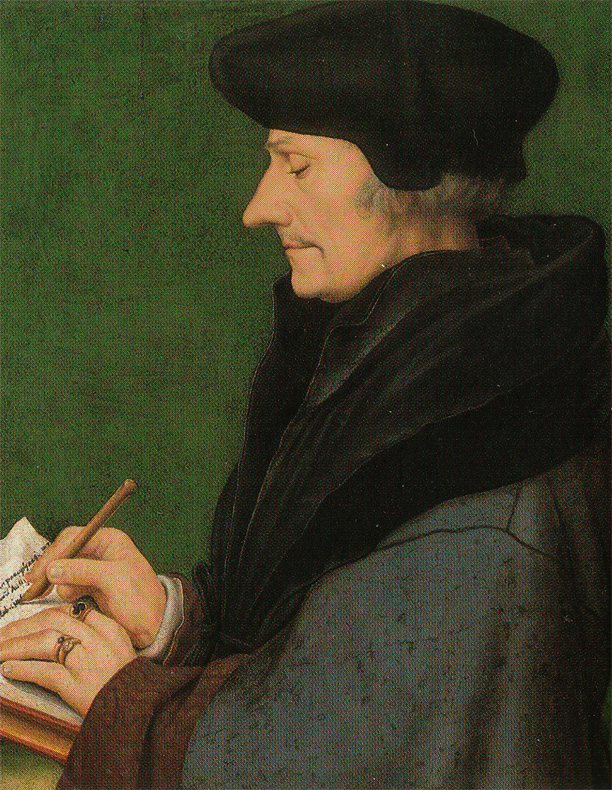
Portrait of Erasmus by Hans Holbein the Younger

Clark discusses the Reformation—the Germany of Albrecht Dürer and Martin Luther and the world of the humanists Erasmus, Michel de Montaigne, and William Shakespeare.

- Riemenschneider
- Erasmus
- Holbein
- Albrecht Dürer
- Melancholia
- Luther
- The Destruction of Images
- Michel de Montaigne
- William Shakespeare

=== 7. Grandeur and Obedience ===
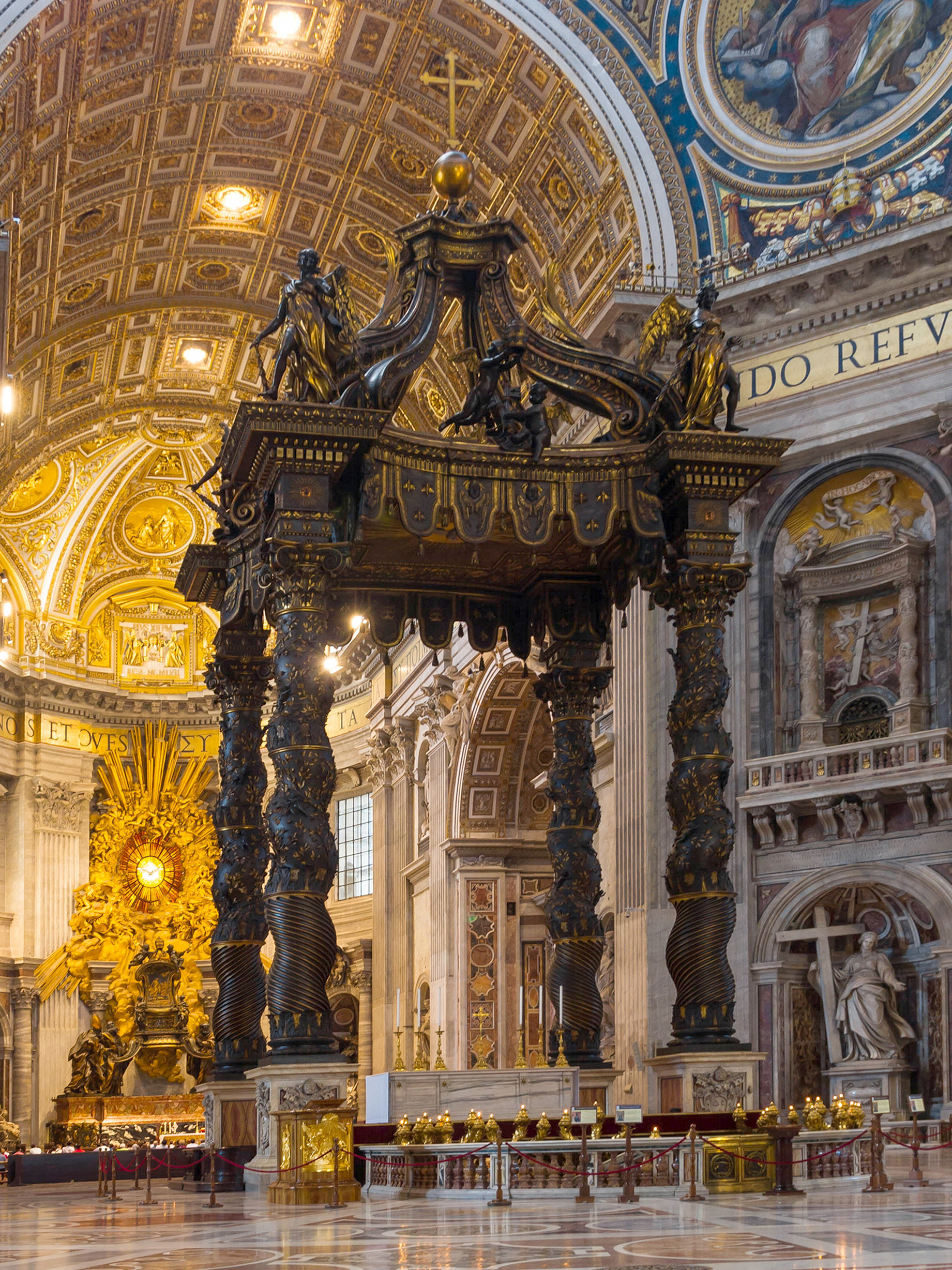
St Peter's Baldachin in St Peter's Basilica, Rome, by Gian Lorenzo Bernini

In the Rome of Michelangelo and Gian Lorenzo Bernini, Clark tells of the Catholic Church's fight—the Counter-Reformation—against the Protestant north and the Church's new splendour symbolised by the glory of St Peter's Basilica.

- The Church of Rome
- The Rome of the Popes
- St Peter's
- The Catholic Church
- The Art of Baroque
- Bernini
- Baldacchino
- The Ecstasy of Teresa

=== 8. The Light of Experience ===
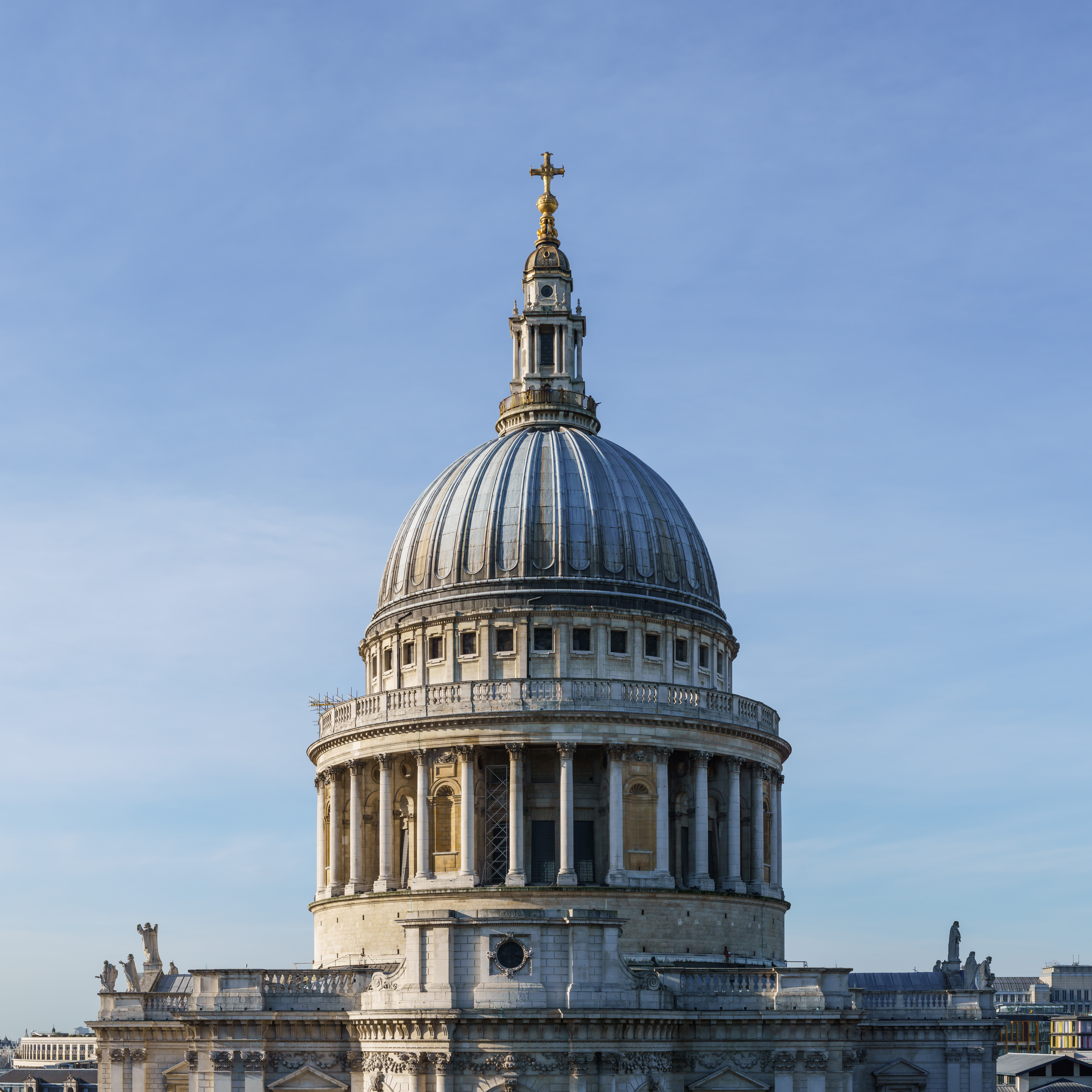
Dome of St Paul's Cathedral, London

Clark tells of new worlds in space and in a drop of water—worlds that the telescope and microscope revealed—and the new realism in the Dutch paintings of Rembrandt and other artists that took the observation of human character to a new stage of development in the 17th century.

- The Light of Holland
- Frans Hals
- Rembrandt
- Descartes
- Vermeer
- The Royal Society
- Sir Christopher Wren
- St Paul's Cathedral

=== 9. The Pursuit of Happiness ===
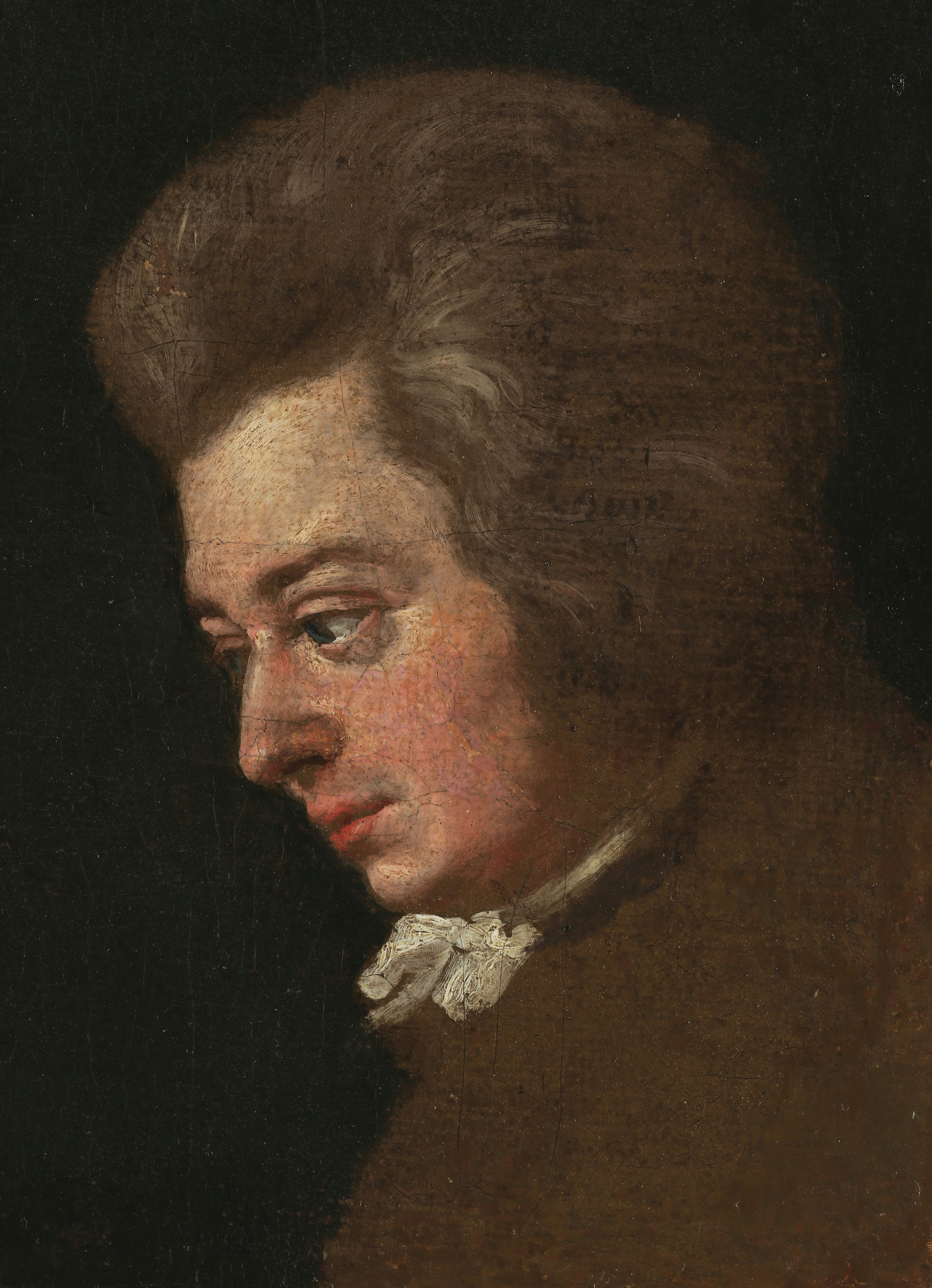
Mozart by Joseph Lange

Clark talks of the harmonious flow and complex symmetries of the works of Johann Sebastian Bach, George Frideric Handel, Joseph Haydn, and Wolfgang Amadeus Mozart and the reflection of their music in the architecture of the Rococo churches and palaces of Bavaria.

- French Classicism
- Johann Sebastian Bach
- Balthasar Neumann
- Handel
- Watteau
- Haydn
- Rococo Buildings
- Wolfgang Amadeus Mozart

=== 10. The Smile of Reason ===
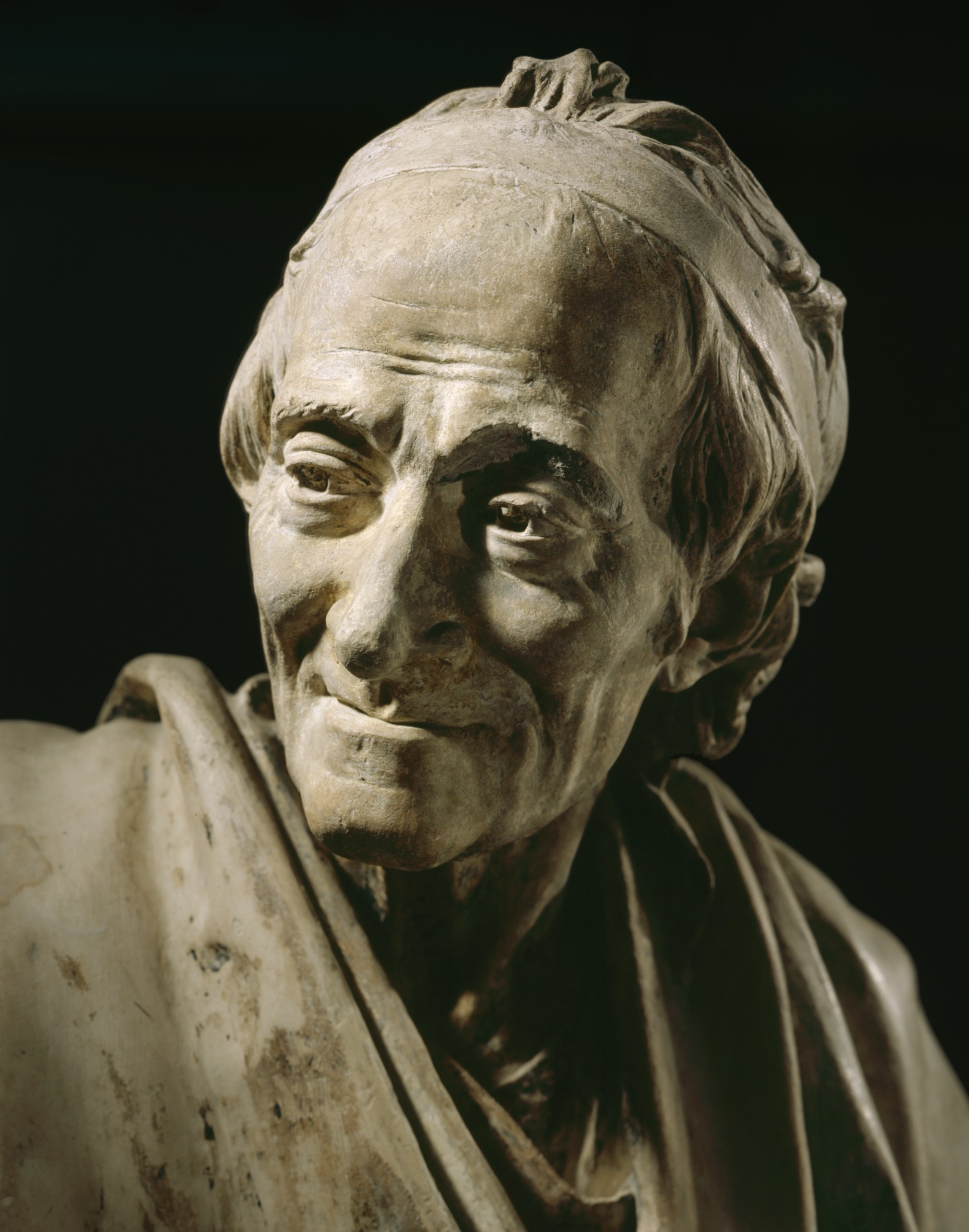
Voltaire by Jean-Antoine Houdon

Clark discusses the Age of Enlightenment, tracing it from the polite conversations of the elegant Parisian salons of the 18th century to subsequent revolutionary politics, the great European palaces of Blenheim and Versailles, and finally Thomas Jefferson's residence Monticello.

- The Enlightenment
- England
- The Parisian Salon
- Chardin
- Scotland
- Voltaire
- Thomas Jefferson
- George Washington

=== 11. The Worship of Nature ===
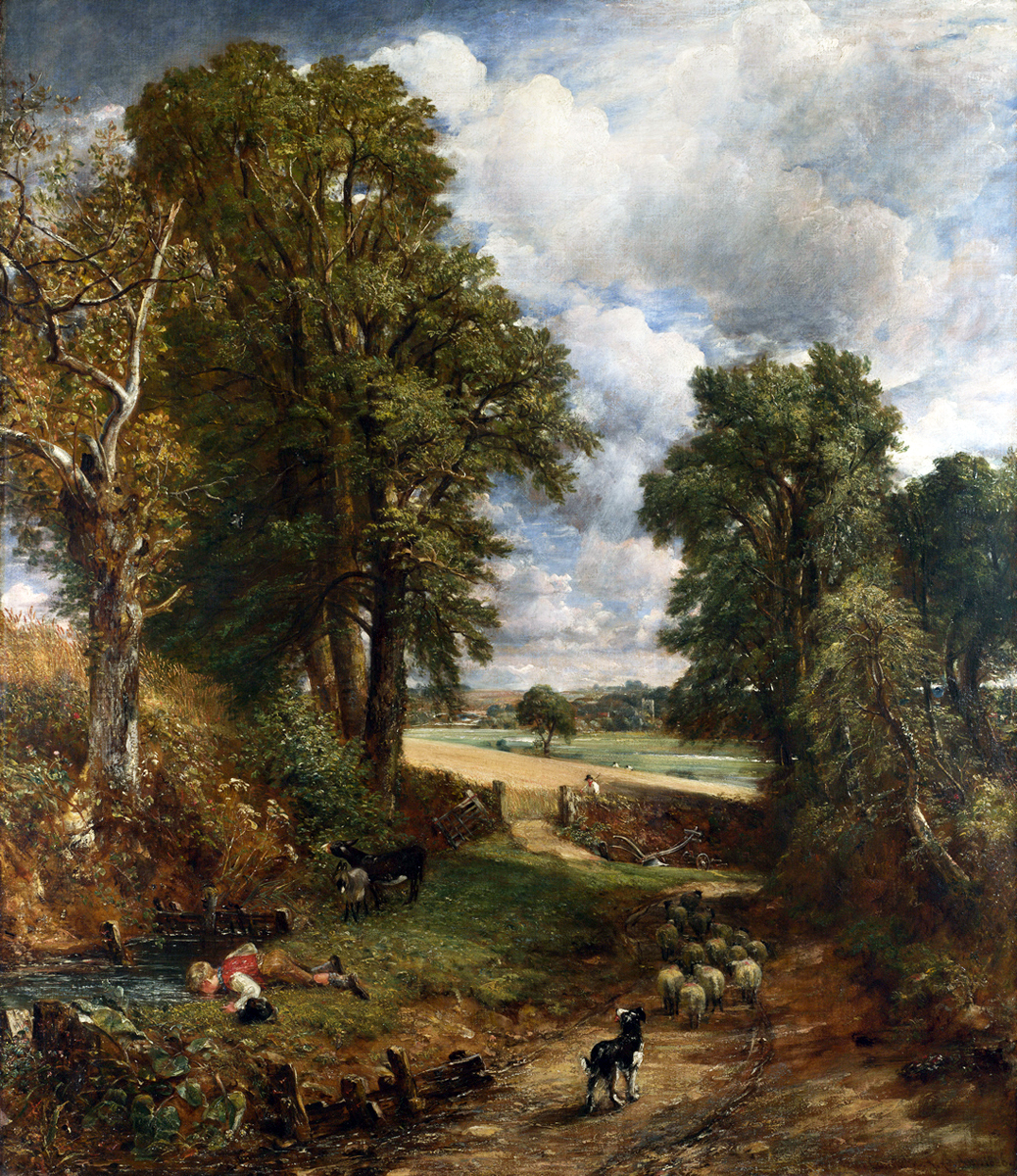
John Constable's The Cornfield

Belief in the divinity of nature, Clark argues, usurped Christianity's position as the chief creative force in Western civilisation and ushered in the Romantic movement. Clark visits Tintern Abbey and the Alps and discusses the landscape paintings of J. M. W. Turner and John Constable.

- The Ruins of Religion
- Rousseau
- The Cult of Sensibility
- Wordsworth
- Constable
- Turner
- The Sky
- Impressionism

=== 12. The Fallacies of Hope ===
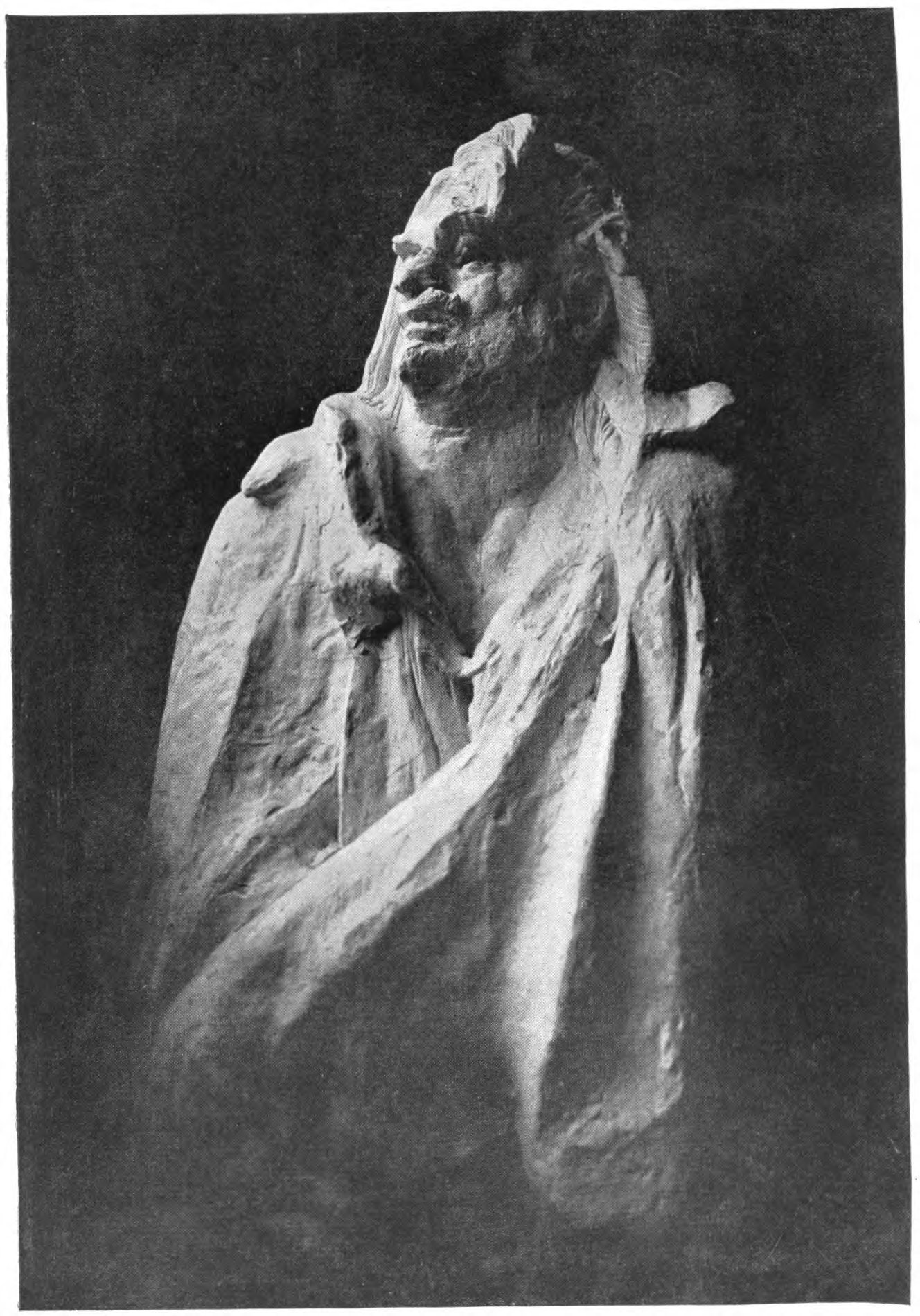
Auguste Rodin's Balzac

Clark argues that the French Revolution led to the dictatorship of Napoleon and the dreary bureaucracies of the 19th century, and he traces the disillusionment of the artists of Romanticism—from Ludwig van Beethoven's music to Lord Byron's poetry, Eugène Delacroix's paintings, and Auguste Rodin's sculpture.

- An Escape from Reason
- The French Revolution
- Napoleon Bonaparte
- Beethoven
- Byron
- Turner and Gericault
- Delacroix
- Rodin

=== 13. Heroic Materialism ===
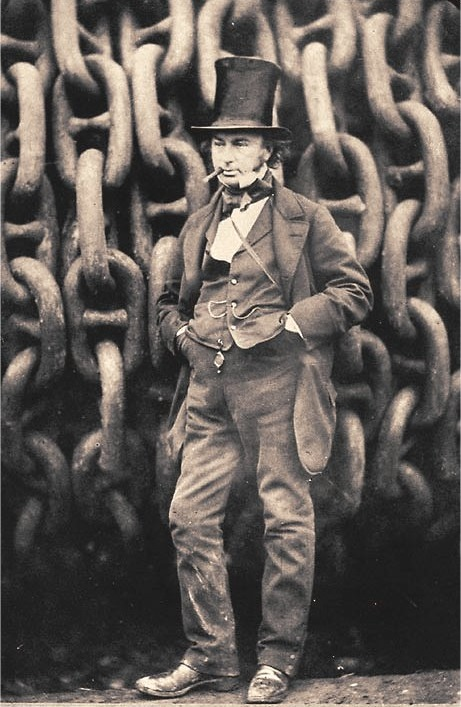
Isambard Kingdom Brunel by Robert Howlett

Clark concludes the series with a discussion of the materialism and humanitarianism of the 19th and 20th centuries. He visits the industrial landscape of 19th century England and the skyscrapers of 20th-century New York City. He argues that the achievements of the engineers and scientists—such as Isambard Kingdom Brunel and Ernest Rutherford—have been matched by those of the great reformers like William Wilberforce and Anthony Ashley-Cooper, 7th Earl of Shaftesbury.

- The Abolition of Slavery
- The Industrial Revolution
- Humanitarianism
- Isambard Kingdom Brunel
- Courbet and Millet
- Tolstoy
- Our Urge to Destruction
- God-given Genius

== Production ==
The series was co-produced by Gill and Peter Montagnon; the cinematographer was Kenneth McMillan; original music was composed by Edwin Astley. Gill directed episodes 1, 3, 5, 8, 10, 12 and 13. Montagnon directed episodes 2, 6, 7, 9, and co-directed episode 11 with Ann Turner, who also directed episode 4.

== Release ==
The series was replayed on BBC Four and released in the Region 2 DVD area in 2005; a Region 1 set followed in 2006. The DVD release included a short interview with Attenborough about the commissioning and production of the series.

== Reception ==
Civilisation attracted unprecedented viewing figures for a high art series: 2.5 million viewers in Britain and 5 million in the US. Clark's accompanying book has never been out of print, and the BBC issued the series on DVDs which continued to sell thousands of copies every year. In 2016 The New Yorker echoed the words of John Betjeman, describing Clark as "the man who made the best telly you’ve ever seen". The magazine's reviewer continued, "Scholars and academics had their understandable quibbles, but for the general public the series was something like a revelation. Art-museum exhibits in both England and the U.S. reported a surge of visitors following each episode."

There have been complaints in recent times that by focusing on a traditional choice of the great artists over the centuries – all men – Clark had neglected women, and presented "a saga of noble names and sublime objects with little regard for the shaping forces of economics or practical politics". His modus operandi was dubbed "the great man approach", and he described himself on screen as a hero-worshipper and a stick-in-the-mud. He commented that his outlook was "nothing striking, nothing original, nothing that could not have been written by an ordinary harmless bourgeois of the later nineteenth century":

I hold a number of beliefs that have been repudiated by the liveliest intellects of our time. I believe that order is better than chaos, creation better than destruction. I prefer gentleness to violence, forgiveness to vendetta. On the whole I think that knowledge is preferable to ignorance, and I am sure that human sympathy is more valuable than ideology.

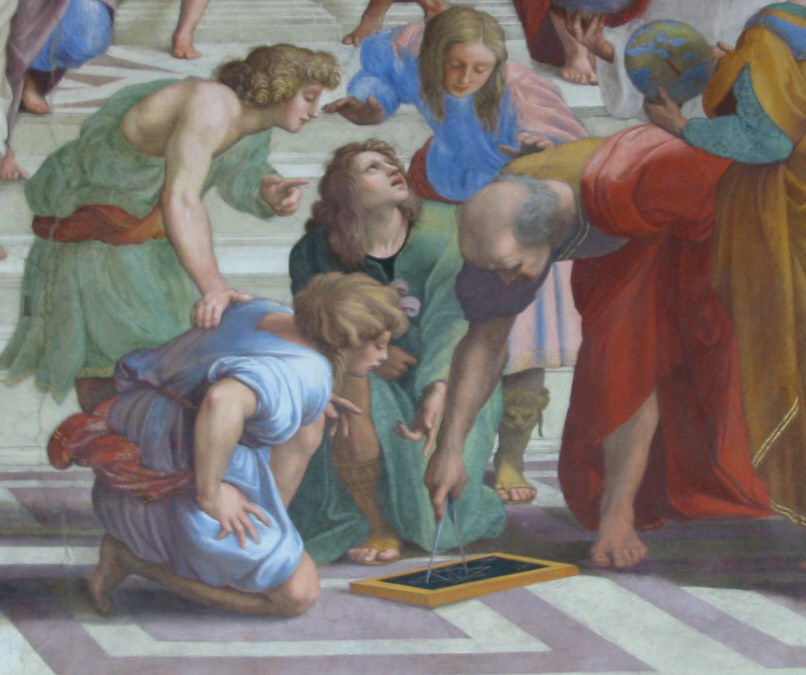
Detail from Raphael's The School of Athens, reproduced on the cover of the book and DVD versions of Civilisation

The broadcaster Huw Wheldon believed that Civilisation was "a truly great series, a major work ... the first magnum opus attempted and realised in terms of TV." There was a widespread view among critics, including some unsympathetic to Clark's selections, that the filming set new standards. The series was described as "visually stunning" by critics on both sides of the Atlantic, including Paul B. Harvey in the US and Mary Beard in Britain. In 2011 Jonathan Jones wrote in The Guardian of Civilisation's "sheer visual beauty ... the camerawork and direction ... rise to the poetry of cinema".

The British Film Institute notes how Civilisation changed the shape of cultural television, setting the standard for later documentary series, from Alastair Cooke's America (1972) and Jacob Bronowski's The Ascent of Man (1973) to the present day.

== Sequels ==
The BBC announced in 2015 that it was to make a ten-episode sequel to Clark's series, to be called Civilisations, with three presenters, Mary Beard, David Olusoga and Simon Schama. A co-production with PBS in the United States, it would not cover western European civilisation in the same detail, but would additionally cover Graeco-Roman and non-European cultures. The series, reduced from the planned ten to nine episodes, was trailed in February 2018, with transmission starting on 1 March in Britain and 17 April in the US on PBS.

A further follow-up, Civilisations: Rise and Fall narrated by Sophie Okonedo, was broadcast in 2025. It explored the demise of Ancient Egypt, the Roman Empire, the Aztecs and the Tokugawa shogunate.

== See also ==
- Ways of Seeing, 1972 series
- The Ascent of Man, 1973 series
- The Shock of the New, 1980 series

== Sources ==
- Clark, Kenneth (1969). Civilisation: A Personal View. London: BBC and John Murray. OCLC 879537495.
- Clark, Kenneth (1977). The Other Half: A Self-Portrait. London: John Murray. ISBN 978-0-7195-3432-4.
- Hearn, Marcus (2005). Civilisation. London: BBC. OCLC 778343652.
- Stourton, James (2016). Kenneth Clark: Life, Art and Civilisation. London: Collins. ISBN 978-0-00-749341-8.
