= C.G. Jung Club London =

UK society for the study of analytical psychology

C.G. Jung Club London (formerly known as the C.G. Jung Analytical Psychology Club) is the first British society for the study of analytical psychology. It was founded in September 1922, inspired by the earlier Psychology Club Zürich.

The C.G. Jung Club was founded by five psychologists, including Helton Godwin Baynes. It has published Harvest: Journal for Jungian Studies since 1954. As of 1994, the organization had 250 members.
