= Cary Baynes =

American psychologist and translator

Cary Baynes, born Cary Fink (1883–1977) was an American Jungian psychologist and translator. She translated several works by Jung, as well as Richard Wilhelm's version of the I Ching.

== Life ==
Cary Fink was born on September 26, 1883, in Mexico City. She and her sister were brought up in their mother's home in Louisville, Kentucky. She studied at Vassar College, where she was taught by Kristine Mann, and graduated in 1906. She went on to study medicine at Johns Hopkins University, marrying her fellow medical student, the future anthropologist Jaime de Angulo, in 1910. She graduated in 1911, and the pair settled in Carmel, California, in 1913. In 1918 they had a daughter, Ximena. Cary objected to Jaime's plans to home-school Ximena as eccentric and autocratic. Since 1915 Jaime had also divided his attention between Cary and Lucy "Nancy" Freeland, spending summer 1920 living with Nancy. In 1921, at Kristine Mann's suggestion, Cary De Angulo moved to Zürich to study with Carl Jung, taking Ximena with her, and living in a house on Lake Zurich with her sister Henri Zinno. She and Jaime De Angulo agreed to an amicable divorce.

Though she never practiced analysis herself, Fink became a respected friend and collaborator with Jung. In 1924–25 she worked on a fresh transcription of Jung's manuscript Liber Novus. Though she did not finish the transcription, she had ongoing discussions with Jung about its potential publication. She also transcribed and edited his 1925 seminar. In 1925 she met Jung's assistant Helton Godwin Baynes, known to friends as Peter, at the Jungian Conference at Swanage. They married in 1927, setting up home in Hemel Hempstead in England, though they moved to California in 1928. The pair collaborated on translating Jung into English, and in 1929 Cary also undertook the translation of Richard Wilhelm's translation of the I Ching.

In 1931 Cary Baynes divorced Peter, who had fallen in love with another woman in 1930. Through the 1930s she continued her translation of the I Ching, and worked with Olga Fröbe-Kapteyn on her 'Eranos Project'. In 1938 she met Paul and Mary Mellon, founders of the Bollingen Foundation, introducing them to Olga Fröbe. The I Ching was eventually published in the Bollingen Series.

In the 1950s Baynes, prompted by Olga Fröbe and Jung, began collaboration with Lucy Heyer on a biography of Jung. She considered basing her biography on Liber Novus, but to Jung's disappointment withdrew from the project.

Cary Baynes remained intellectually active up to her death in October 1977. Her papers are held at the Wellcome Library.

== Works ==
- (tr. with H. G. Baynes) Contributions to Analytical Psychology by Carl Jung. London: Routledge and Kegan Paul, 1928.
- (tr.) The Secret of the Golden Flower by Lü Dongbin. London: K. Paul, Trench, Trubner, 1931. Translated from the German translation by Richard Wilhelm, with a European commentary by Carl Jung.
- (tr. with W. S. Dell) Modern Man in Search of a Soul by Carl Jung. London: K. Paul, Trench, Trubner & Co., 1933.
- (tr. with H. G. Baynes) Two Essays on Analytical Psychology. New York: Dodd, Mead and Co., 1928.
- (tr.) The I Ching, or, Book of Changes. New York: Pantheon Books, 1950. The Richard Wilhelm translation rendered into English. Foreword by Carl Jung.
- (tr.) Change: Eight Lectures on the I Ching by Hellmut Wilhelm. Princeton: Princeton University Press, 1960.
