= Louis Zinkin =

British analytical psychologist

- Born: Louis Maurice Zinkin; 24 April 1925; London
- Died: 13 March 1993 (aged 67); London
- Education: Lincoln College, Oxford
- Occupations: Medical doctor, FRCPsych, analytical psychologist, group analyst
- Years active: 1952-1993
- Known for: Contributions to Analytical Psychology and Group Analysis
- Spouse: Hindle Lewicki Zinkin
- Children: 2

Louis Maurice Zinkin (1925 April 24, 1925 – 13 March 1993) was a British analytical psychologist. Earlier in life he had been a ship's surgeon, a physician, a child psychiatrist and Consultant Psychotherapist at St George's Hospital, London. He had the distinction of being a Group Analyst alongside individual and couple work and was the author of many papers and books.

== Biography ==
With a scholarly Jewish ancestry founded in Russian occupied Poland, Zinkin's grandfather, Jacob, escaped the oppressive Pale of Settlement and found sanctuary in 19th century England. After attending City of London School, Louis progressed to Lincoln College, Oxford, where he discovered the writings of Carl Jung while studying medicine. He gained his MD in London and set off for the Far East on board ship. On his return to the UK he worked in several hospitals working his way through medical rotations and specialisms. While at Napsbury Hospital, he trained as an analytical psychologist and rose to becoming honorary senior lecturer at St George's Hospital at Hyde Park Corner and Chairman of the Medical Committee of the British Psychological Society. His teaching load at the hospital and at the Society of Analytical Psychology did not prevent him from becoming himself a patient at the Institute of Group Analysis whence he emerged as a group analyst and later training analyst. In the final decade of his life, he applied with his wife, Hindle Lewicki also a psychotherapist, his rich clinical experience to interventions through couples therapy. From the early 1980s he was dogged by increasingly impaired vision and died suddenly at the relatively young age of 67. He and Hindle had two children.

== Influence ==
As well as an abiding involvement in music, he took up the piano in mid-life, Louis Zinkin viewed the arts through the prism of his clinical reading and work and produced a study of the characters in Thomas Mann's Death in Venice following the release of Luchino Visconti's film. He was galvanised to think about the themes, such as pedophilia and Jung's concept of individuation, evoked by the novella in a number of his patients who reported seeing the film based on it, and the effects it had on them. Following Martin Buber who had a correspondence with Jung, Zinkin's approach was often to engage in dialogue with colleagues. In the group analytic field he took on the psychoanalyst Malcolm Pines on the nature of mirroring, suggesting it was not merely benign as Pines had it, but could be much more paradoxical, even malign. His original (1991) contribution to the debate on the nature of the self reverberates in discussions decades after his death. Much like Jung's, Zinkin's attitude was characterised by the idea of a search, whether as a thinker, therapist, teacher or committee member. He was regarded as always curious and courageous in exploring intellectual boundaries.

== Select bibliography ==
- Person to Person: The Search for the Human Dimension in Psychotherapy (1978)
- Is there still a Place for the Medical Model (1983)
- The Hologram as a Model for Analytical Psychology (1987)
- A Gnostic View of the Therapy Group (1989)
- Dialogue in the Analytic Setting: Selected Papers of Louis Zinkin on Jung and on Group Analysis (1998)
- The Psyche and the Social World with the psychologist, Dennis Brown (2000)
- Your Self: did you find it or did you make it? (1991/2008)
