= Lally Horstmann =

German writer and salonnière

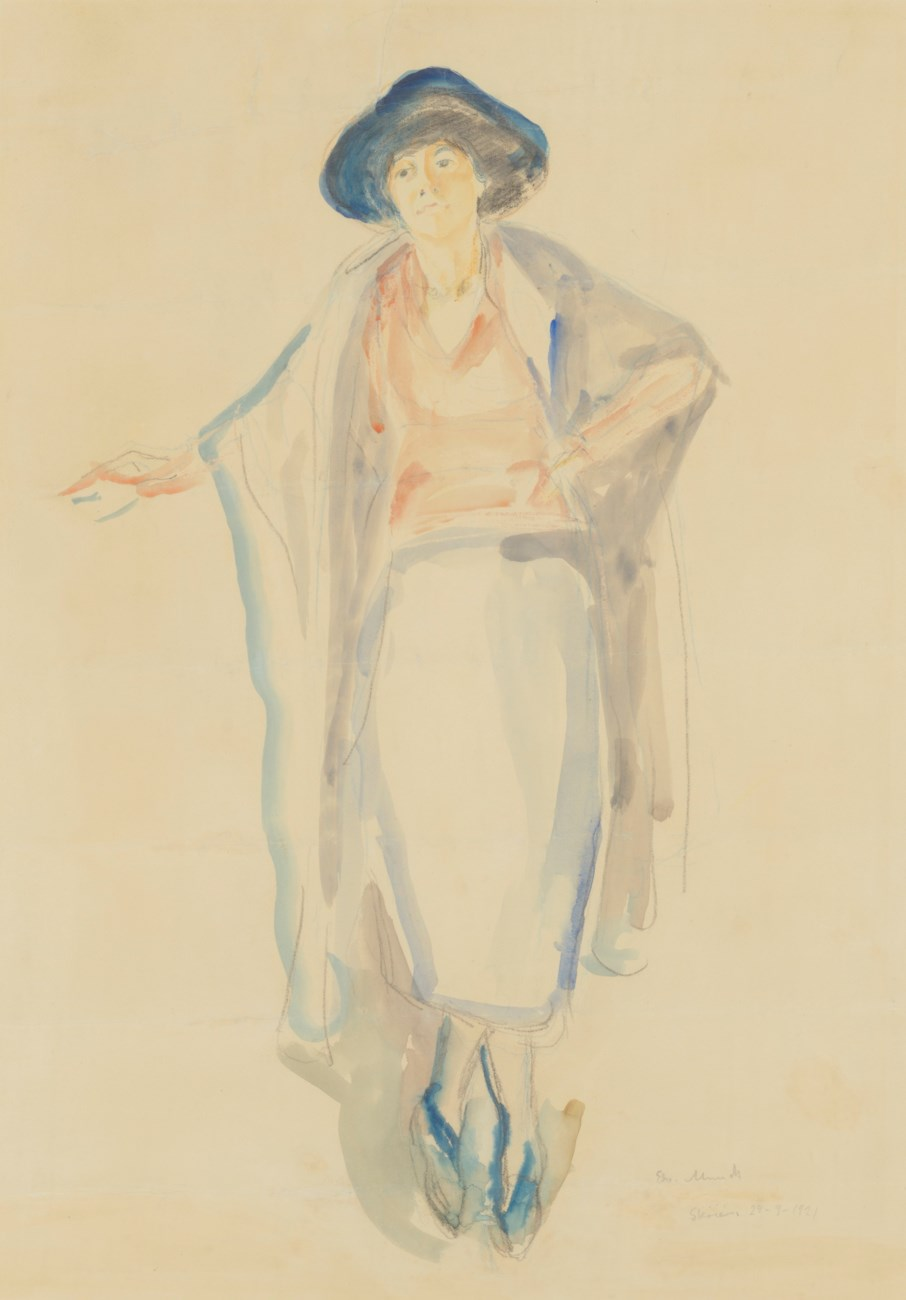
- 1921 watercolor portrait of Hortsmann by Edvard Munch
- Born: Léonie Lizzie Fanny Helene Schwabach; 17 March 1898; Berlin, Prussia, German Empire
- Died: 10 August 1954 (aged 56); São Paulo, São Paulo, Brazil
- Other names: Lali Hortsmann; Lally von Schwabach
- Occupations: writer salonnière
- Spouse: Alfred Horstmann (1919–1947, his death)
- Partner: Anthony Marreco (1951–1954, her death)
- Parent(s): Paul von Schwabach; Eleanor Schröder
- Relatives: Vera von der Heydt (sister); Julius Leopold Schwabach (grandfather); Erik-Ernst Schwabach (cousin)

Lally Horstmann (née Léonie Lizzie Fanny Helene von Schwabach; 17 March 1898 – 10 August 1954) was a German writer and salonnière. She had a privileged upbringing as member of the Berliner Jewish bourgeoisie. During her childhood, her family was elevated to the Prussian nobility by Wilhelm II. She married a German diplomat and art collector and became involved in literary and political salons. She authored two memoirs, Kein Grund für Tränen and Unendlich viel ist uns geblieben, which documented her life in Nazi Germany during World War II. Following her husband's death in a Soviet Gulag she fled to Brazil, where she died in 1954.

== Early life and family ==
Horstmann was born Léonie Lizzie Fanny Helene Schwabach on 17 March 1898 in Berlin. She was the daughter of Paul von Schwabach, a banker and historian, and Eleanor Schröder, the daughter of a Hamburg banker. She was the granddaughter of the banker and diplomat Julius Leopold Schwabach and a first cousin of the writer and publisher Erik-Ernst Schwabach. The Schwabach family was Jewish, but her father converted to Lutheranism.

Horstmann grew up in the cosmopolitan, cultivated milieu of the Jewish financial bourgeoisie in Berlin and on the Schwabach family's country estate in Kerzendorf, near Ludwigsfelde. In 1907, her father was raised to the hereditary Prussian nobility by Emperor Wilhelm II, at which point the family surname took on the nobiliary particle von (descending from). Horstmann's father was a member of the Kaiser Wilhelm Society and one of the hundred wealthiest people in the Kingdom of Prussia. Her sister, Vera, married Baron Eduard von der Heydt.

== Adult life ==
Horstmann married the diplomat and art collector Alfred Horstmann, who was of Jewish descent, in 1919. The couple moved to Oslo in 1920, where her husband was stationed as a diplomat, and returned to Berlin the following year. Back in Germany, they lived in a mansion in Berlin, where she managed the household.

Horstmann hosted literary, political, and cultural salons at her country estate. She authored a variety of historical and non-fiction works, including Kein Grund für Tränen and Unendlich viel ist uns geblieben, which documented life during the war.

The British painter John Augustus Edwin painted a portrait of Horstmann around 1922 or 1923. It was auctioned in London at Sotheby's in January 2007. She had previously been painted, in 1921, by the Norwegian artit Edvard Munch. The Berlin City Museum Foundation owns an expressionist portrait bust of Horstmann, created by the sculptor Fritz Huf.

Her husband was considered a "half-Jew" under Nazi Germany's racial laws, and survived World War II under difficult circumstances. Following the fall of the Nazi regime, the Horstmanns faced persecution and harassment by the Soviets. Following her husband's death in a Gulag in 1947, Horstmann fled to Brazil. As a widow, she was involved with the British barrister Anthony Marreco, the former husband of Lady Ursula Manners. She died in São Paulo in 1954, leaving part of her fortune to Marreco. Her gravesite was later destroyed due to construction on a road.
