= Graylingwell Hospital =

Former psychiatric hospital in Chichester, United Kingdom

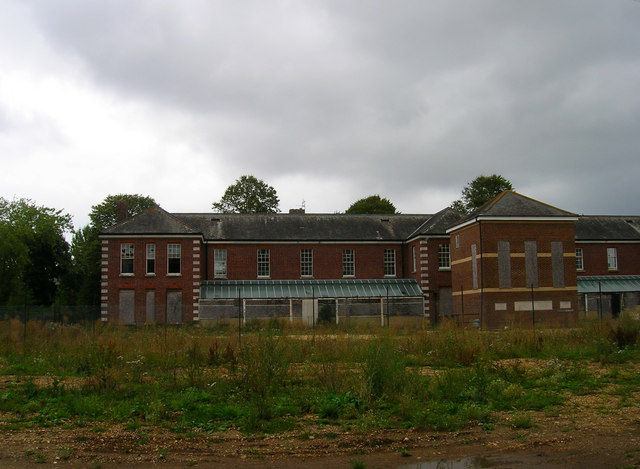
- Gordon House, part of Graylingwell Hospital, in 2006

- Shown in West Sussex

Geography
- Location: Chichester, United Kingdom
- Coordinates: 50.84975°N 0.76852°W

Organisation
- Care system: Public NHS
- Type: Psychiatric

History
- Founded: 1897
- Closed: 2001

Links
- Lists: Hospitals in the United Kingdom

Graylingwell Hospital (formerly the West Sussex County Asylum, or West Sussex County Lunatic Asylum) was a psychiatric hospital in Chichester, West Sussex, United Kingdom.

== Foundation ==
The Local Government Act, 1888 created the administrative county of West Sussex, with its own county council, from the three western rapes of the ancient county of Sussex, that is the rapes of Chichester, Arundel and Bramber. The newly formed West Sussex County Council took over the provision of public services not provided by the local boroughs and boards of guardians, including the care of the insane. Initially, the county continued to use the Sussex County Asylum at Haywards Heath by agreement with East Sussex County Council, but in 1893 following problems with overcrowding, left the union and purchased the Graylingwell Farm estate on the outskirts of Chichester for the purpose of building a new Asylum.

== Design and construction ==
Construction of the asylum began in 1894 and was completed in 1897. The asylum was built of soft red brick with reconstituted stonework ornamentation roofed with slate in a classical Queen Anne style. Lodges and other outbuildings differed in their use of rendered upper storeys and the chapel was built in local flint and reconstituted stone with a red clay tiled roof.

The buildings followed the compact arrow design with wards and corridors radiating from a central service area containing offices, kitchens, a large hall, laundry, stores, water tower and a central power and heating plant. As was standard practice at the time, the asylum employed strict segregation of the sexes, with females confined to the east side of the site and males to the west. The hospital's extensive landscaped grounds also contained an isolation hospital, a chapel and several residences for staff.

The hospital was almost entirely self-sufficient until the end of the 1950s, with 60-acre market gardens and two farms (Graylingwell and St. Martin's). These were worked by able-bodied patients in return for tokens which could be redeemed against purchases in the hospital shop. The farm estate and stock were auctioned off on 25 March 1957 at which time there were 100 head of dairy shorthorns, pigs, sheep and poultry.

As a relief from the demanding manual labour required of physically able inmates, patients were allowed a wide range of social and leisure activities including sports, dances and fetes. The Main Hall provided a focus for these activities, having a proscenium stage, orchestra pit and two Gaumont-Kazee cinema projectors with Rank audio visual rectifiers.

== War Hospital ==
At the outbreak of the First World War, the asylum was requisitioned to serve as a Military Hospital and the inmates were relocated to other asylums in the area. Casualties began arriving on 24 March 1915 directly from the Western Front, via train from Dover. The hospital was returned to civilian use in 1919 following a solemn ceremony during which the last patients left to the sound of the Last Post.

During the Second World War the hospital was not requisitioned but the Summersdale block was commandeered to serve as an acute battle neurosis unit for front-line casualties.

== Further development ==
Following the return to civilian use in 1919, the asylum became known as Graylingwell Mental Hospital, the term 'asylum' having fallen out of general use by the 1920s (the term was later legally abolished by the Mental Treatment Act, 1930). Between 1930 and 1933 the hospital was extended to include an admission hospital (Summersdale), nurses' home (Pinewood House), female tuberculosis ward and two female villas.

== After 1948 ==
=== Research ===
After the war a clinical psychiatry research unit was in operation for about twenty years at the hospital, where a team including doctors Olof Lippold, J.W.T. Redfearn and others, carried out research into depersonalization states and evoked critical potentials in animals, including humans and contributed to numerous scientific papers.

=== National Health Service ===
In 1948, the hospital transferred to the National Health Service. At this time, the patient population exceeded 1000 and expansion was urgently needed. During the 1950s and 60s the hospital saw the extension of day rooms in acute wards, the addition of an occupational therapy department next to the chapel and a new block to the south west of the site.

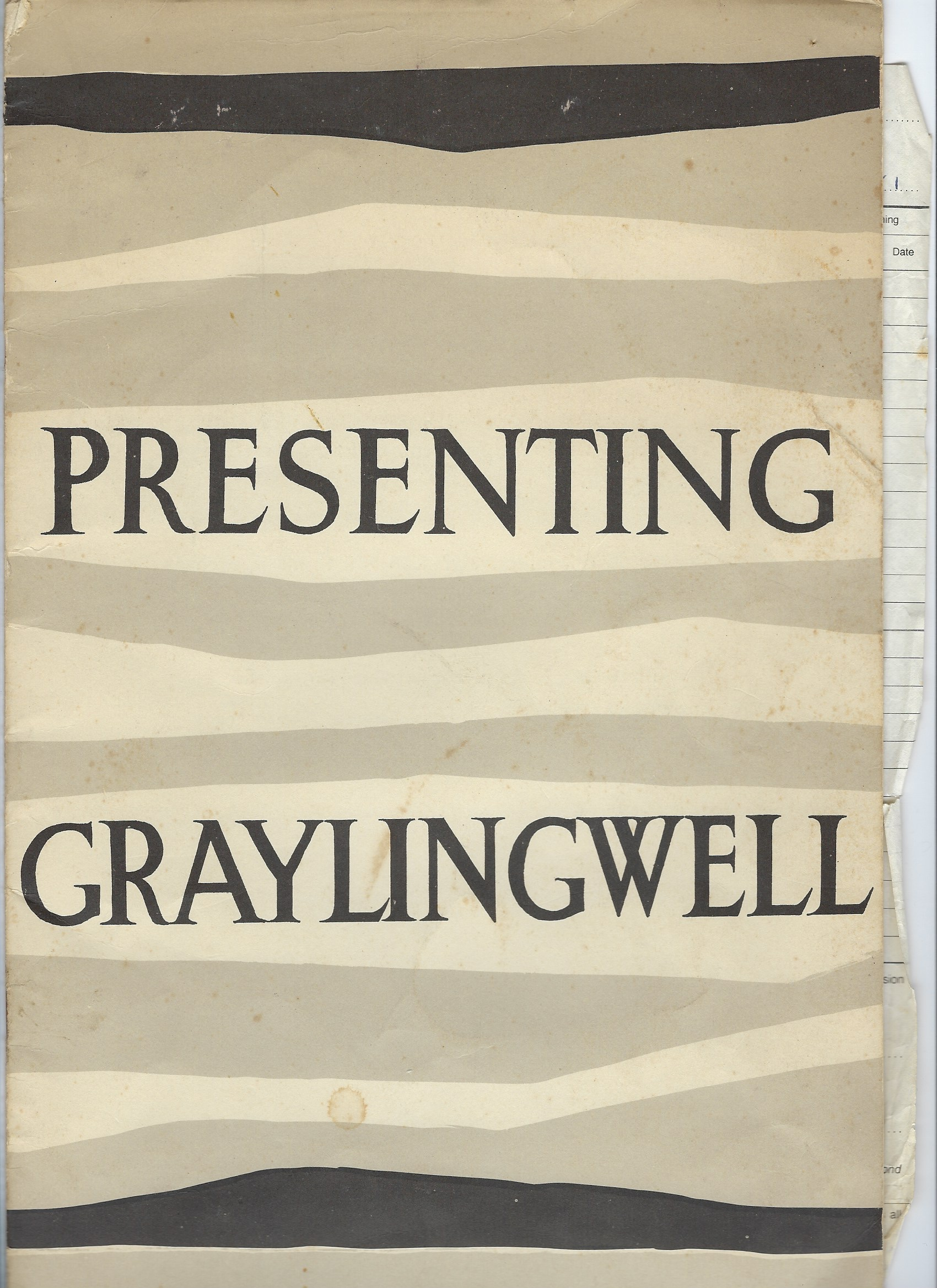
Patient leaflet circa 1981

Later extensions included outpatient clinics, a social club and changing rooms for the sports ground.

During the 1960s, the Chichester Observer reported that "Patients have every convenience at hand for night requirements, even down to carpet slippers. Blinds and curtains give a home-like comfort to the windows. Books, papers and magazines are liberally provided, while dominoes, cards and games of many kinds serve to cheer and lighten the evenings. Patients are encouraged to take part in outdoor sports, a good cricket and football field being provided. In the winter, dances, theatrical entertainments and concerts in the commodious theatre will continue treatment of the highest curative value."

== Decline and closure ==
Graylingwell Hospital celebrated its centenary in 1997 with the publication of various books and pamphlets and an exhibition in the Chichester District Museum featuring original plans and drawings. By this time, patient numbers had declined significantly, with National Health Service policy having moved away from long stays in psychiatric wards to care in the community.

The last psychiatric in-patients left the hospital in May 2001, although its out-patient clinics and Summersdale unit remained open. The remaining valuable contents of the hospital were sold at auction on 7 June 2001. Some of the empty buildings were put to use as administrative offices of the Weald and Downs NHS Trust, but others were left unoccupied and allowed to become derelict. In 2009 the last NHS services moved out of the buildings leaving them empty.

== Redevelopment ==
Following the vacation of the hospital buildings, the site was sold to developer Linden Homes and following planning consultation, demolition and conversion work began in 2010 to turn the site into a carbon-neutral community called Graylingwell Park. As of December 2012 the central block (with the exception of the administration block and water tower) had been demolished and the ward blocks were being readied for conversion to apartments. The chapel had been repurposed by a religious group while the isolation hospital, Graylingwell Farmhouse and Richmond Villa remained derelict.

== Hospital records ==
The hospital's archives, including early patient admission papers, are held at West Sussex Record Office in Chichester. As of 2010, only the records from the early years were available for public viewing, since all patient records are treated as closed for one hundred years.
Extensive historical information is also available in the books by Barone Hopper, who was a specialist Psychiatric Social Worker, both at Graylingwell Hospital and in the West Sussex community.
