= Peter Lomas =

Peter Eric Samuel Lomas (1923 – 2010) was an English psychotherapist and writer, "one of the most independent-minded and quietly influential psychotherapists in Britain". In 1974 he helped found what later became the Guild of Psychotherapists, and he later helped establish the Cambridge Society for Psychotherapy (also known as 'the Outfit').

== Life ==
Peter Lomas was born on 27 February 1923 in Stockport, and grew up there. He studied medicine at Manchester University, working at Manchester Royal Infirmary's neurological unit before working as a GP. Moving into psychiatry, he worked with families at the Cassell Hospital therapeutic community. In 1954 he married his wife, Diana.

Lomas trained as a psychoanalyst under Charles Rycroft at the Institute of Psychoanalysis, but became increasingly skeptical about the orthodox approach to training psychotherapists. Along with Camilla Bosanquet, Ben Churchill, John Heaton and Joe Redfearn in 1974, he helped to establish what later became the Guild of Psychotherapists. In 1980 he moved to Cambridge, where he helped to establish 'the Outfit' (later more formally known as the Cambridge Society for Psychotherapy), a non-hierarchical psychotherapeutic training organization based on students' collective learning and evaluation.

A festschrift to Lomas, Committed Uncertainty in Psychotherapy, was published for his 75th birthday.

He died on 12 January 2010. Later that year the Cambridge Society for Psychotherapy organized a conference in his memory, 'The Legacy of Peter Lomas'. Papers from the conference were published in an issue of the European Journal of Psychotherapy and Counselling.

== Works ==
- (ed.) The Predicament of the Family. 1967.
- True and False Experience. 1973.
- The Case for a Personal Psychotherapy. 1981.
- The Limits of Interpretation. 1987.
- Cultivating Intuition. 1993.
- Personal Disorder and Family Life. 1997.
- Doing Good?: Psychotherapy Out of its Depth. 1999.
