= Frieda Fordham =

Social worker

Frieda Fordham (born Winefride Rothwell; 23 February 1903 – 7 January 1988) was a psychiatric social worker, Jungian analyst and writer. Her second husband was the innovative analytical psychologist, Michael Fordham.

== Life ==
Rothwell's initial career as a dancer was cut short when at seventeen she married Percy Campbell Hoyle in 1920. They had two sons. After the marriage ended she studied at the London School of Economics and trained there as a psychiatric social worker. She took up a post with the 'Leicester Education Committee's Psychological Service and later with the Nottingham Child Guidance Centre. While there in 1936 she met a young psychiatrist, Michael Fordham, whom she married in 1940. She later trained as a Jungian analyst and was a founding member of the Society of Analytical Psychology, with her husband, Michael and six others. She became a training analyst and was the author, among other works, of a classic text, An Introduction to Jung's Psychology, first published by Penguin Books in 1953 and subsequently much reprinted and translated into several languages. Frieda went to stay with the Jungs in Switzerland and discussed her work with them, especially with Emma Jung. She was a primary contributor in the Encyclopædia Britannica for the entry about Swiss psychologist C. G. Jung.

She was also responsible for the famous opening words of the long-running BBC Home Service children's radio programme, Listen with Mother - "Are you sitting comfortably? Then I'll begin." After a decade of failing health, she died early in 1988. She was buried in Old Jordans in Buckinghamshire, England.

== Publications ==
- An Introduction to Jung's Psychology. Harmondsworth: Penguin Books Ltd. 1953 ISBN 978-0-14-020273-1
- "The care of regressed patients and the child archetype". J. Anal. Psychol. 9, 1. 1964
- "Some views on individuation". J. Anal. Psychol. 14, 1. 1969
