= Julius Leopold Schwabach =

- Born: 31 May 1831; Breslau, Prussia
- Died: 23 February 1898 (aged 66); Berlin, Germany
- Occupation: Banker
- Spouse: Leonie Jeannette Henriette Keyzer
- Children: Paul von Schwabach
- Relatives: Lally Horstmann (granddaughter); Vera von der Heydt (granddaughter); Erik-Ernst Schwabach (grandson)

Julius Leopold Schwabach (31 May 1831 – 23 February 1898) was a German banker of Jewish descent and British consul-general in Berlin.

At the age of sixteen he entered the banking-house of Samuel Bleichröder—his mother's brother-in-law—, and twenty years later became a partner; from 1893, when his cousin Gerson von Bleichröder died, he was the senior partner of the house. He was also president of the directors of the Berliner Börse, and subsequently presided over a standing committee of that institution.
