= Journal of Analytical Psychology =

- Discipline: Analytical psychology
- Language: English

Publication details
- History: 1955–present
- Publisher: Wiley

Standard abbreviations
- ISO 4: J. Anal. Psychol.

Indexing
- ISSN: 0021-8774 (print); 1468-5922 (web)

Links
- Journal homepage

The Journal of Analytical Psychology is the peer-reviewed academic journal of the Society of Analytical Psychology. It was founded in 1955.

== History ==
The journal published its first volume and issue on October 31, 1955. It was edited by Michael Fordham.
