= Eduard von der Heydt =

German banker and patron (1882–1964)

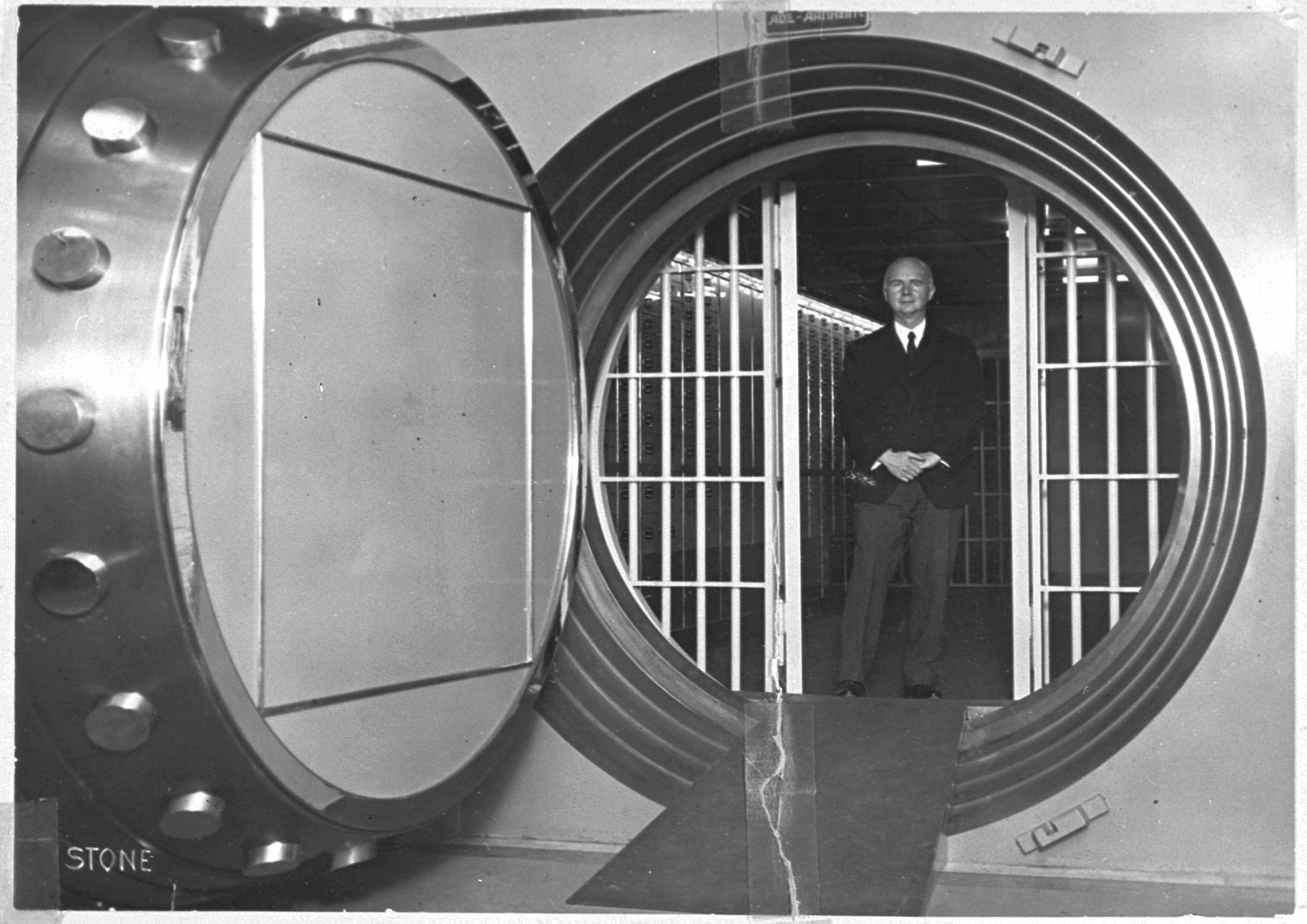
- Eduard von der Heydt in the vault of Von der Heydt‘s Bank AG, Berlin, black and white photograph, 1928
- Born: September 26, 1882; Elberfeld, Germany
- Died: April 3, 1964 (aged 81); Ascona, Switzerland
- Occupations: Banker, art collector, patron
- Known for: Museum Rietberg, "ars una"
- Title: Freiherr
- Spouse: Vera von Schwabach (1919–1927, divorced)

Eduard Freiherr von der Heydt (September 26, 1882 – April 3, 1964) was a German and Swiss banker, art collector and patron.

== Biography ==
He was born in Elberfeld, Germany, and died in Ascona, Switzerland. Heydt served in the Imperial German Army during World War I. He was badly wounded from a gunshot wound to the stomach, an injury that caused complications for the rest of his life. In 1919, he married Vera von Schwabach (1899–1996), daughter of the Berlin banker Paul von Schwabach. The marriage ended in divorce in 1927; there were no children.

Heydt's collections were the basis for the creation of the Museum Rietberg in Zürich, Switzerland. He was also the former owner of Monte Verità, a well-known site of many different Utopian and cultural events and communities, which upon his death became the property of the Swiss Canton of Ticino. He was a member of the NSDAP until he became a Swiss citizen in 1937 and left the party in 1939. After the Second World War, he was arrested for treason for his handling of payment transactions for the German intelligence service under Wilhelm Canaris. Heydt was acquitted in 1948. Unconvinced of his innocence, the U.S. government confiscated all of Heydt's American bank deposits as well as his works of art, transferring them to the Buffalo Museum of Science as "enemy assets" under the Trading with the Enemy Act.

Heydt described art using the term "ars una", an all-encompassing art that appreciates diversity as it is found throughout the world.

== Ancestry ==
Ancestry of Eduard Freiherr von der Heydt
Great-Great Grandparents	Daniel Heinrich von der Heydt (1767–1832) ∞ 1794; Wilhelmine Kersten (1771–1854)	Johann Wilhelm Blank (1773–1846) ∞ 1796; Sibilla Helene Simons (1776–1839)	Johann Peter Boeddinghaus (1751–1826) ∞ 1778; Maria Helene Funcke (1760–1824)	Johann Abraham Siebel (1773–1830) ∞ 1796; Isabella Margaretha Siebel (1775–1844)	Johann Kaspar Haarhaus (1749–1828) ∞ 1784; Anna Christina Bargmann (1760–1802)	Johann Peter Bargmann (1774–1852) ∞ 1798; Ida Baltz (1780–1863)	Johann Jakob Aders (1768–1825) ∞ 1793; Anna Helene Brink (1770–1844)	Johann Peter Boeddinghaus (1788–1837) ∞ 1813; Amalia Middendorf (1793–1823)
Great Grandparents	August Freiherr von der Heydt (1801–1874) ∞ 1824; Julie Blank (1804–1865)		Karl Heinrich Boeddinghaus (1797–1872) ∞ 1823; Sophie Siebel (1802–1885)		Jacob Wilhelm Haarhaus (1798–1881) ∞ 1830; Johanna Sophie Bargmann (1803–1872)		Alfred Aders (1809–1880) ∞ 1835; Bertha Boeddinghaus (1814–1891)	
Grandparents	August von der Heydt (1825–1867) ∞ 1849; Maria Helene Boeddinghaus (1828–1899)				Gustav Haarhaus (1831–1911) ∞ 1860; Ida Auguste Aders (1838–1876)			
Parents	August von der Heydt (1851–1929) ∞ 1880; Selma Haarhaus (1862–1944)							
Eduard Freiherr von der Heydt (1882–1964)

== Works ==
- Eduard von der Heydt/Werner von Rheinbaben: Auf dem Monte Verità. Erinnerungen und Gedanken über Menschen, Kunst und Politik, Atlantis, Zürich 1958.
