= Gerhard Adler =

British psychologist

Gerhard Adler (14 April 1904 – 23 December 1988) was a British psychologist and a major figure in the world of analytical psychology, known for his translation into English from the original German and editorial work on the Collected Works of Carl Gustav Jung. He also edited C.G. Jung Letters, with Aniela Jaffe. With his wife Hella, he was a founding member of the Society of Analytical Psychology in London, of which C.G. Jung was first President. Despite their years-long collaboration on translating and editing, Adler's allegiance to Jung and the "Zurich school" caused irreconcilable differences with Michael Fordham, and led to his leaving the Society of Analytical Psychology and founding the Association of Jungian Analysts.

== Biography ==
Adler was born in Berlin of German-Jewish descent. He earned his PhD at the University of Freiburg in 1927. In 1932 he went to Zurich to study and train under Jung at the Burghölzli psychiatric hospital. The two men maintained a close association until Jung's death in 1961.

Fleeing Nazi persecution, he established a psychoanalytic practice in London in 1936. He wrote and lectured internationally in German and English, and authored Studies in Analytical Psychology (1948), The Living Symbol (1961), and Dynamics of the Self (1979), all of which have become important books in their field. He was one of the eight co-founders of the Society of Analytical Psychology in 1945, and was a founder of the Association of Jungian Analysts in 1977.

Adler was a founding member of the International Association for Analytical Psychology, and served as its president for two consecutive terms (1971-1977). His wife Hella, also a Jungian analyst, was his partner in many endeavours, while she was always independent and forthright in her views.
