= Hugh Crichton-Miller =

Scottish psychiatrist

Hugh Crichton-Miller (5 February 1877, Genoa – 1 January 1959, London) was a Scottish physician and psychiatrist. He founded the Bowden House nursing home for nervous diseases at Harrow-on-the-Hill in 1912 and the Tavistock Clinic in London in 1920.

== Biography ==
The son of a Presbyterian minister to the Scottish church in Genoa and his Scots wife, he was sent at twelve to attend Fettes College in Edinburgh. He followed an arts programme as well as Medicine at Edinburgh University. In 1902 he obtained his MD from the University of Edinburgh with a thesis on hypnotism. He continued his studies at Pavia University. During World War I, Crichton-Miller joined the Royal Army Medical Corps and served in the rank of lieutenant colonel. His concern for sufferers of Shell shock, led after the war to his founding a charitable clinic in Tavistock Square to treat nervous complaints. He remained its honorary medical director until 1934, followed by a further seven years as its honorary senior physician. By 1939 he was working alongside 90 honorary medical colleagues. ('Honorary' meant that they were working Pro bono.)

His first book was on hypnotism and disease and came out in 1912. He became a popular lecturer and writer on the 'New Psychology', which was broadly based on the work of the Swiss psychiatrist, Carl Gustav Jung. A further three books appeared after the war forming a trilogy: 'The New Psychology and the Teacher' (1921), 'The New Psychology and the Parent' (1922), followed by 'The New Psychology and the Preacher' (1924). He became chairman of the medical section of the British Psychological Society and in 1938 President of the Psychiatry section of the Royal Society of Medicine and president of the International General Medical Society for Psychotherapy, and vice-president of the C. G. Jung Institute, Zürich. The British Medical Association appointed him to the Sir Charles Hastings lectureship. During the first three years of World War II he was officer-in-charge of the Emergency Medical Psychiatry Service at Watford hospital.

Crichton-Miller married Eleanor Lorimer of Edinburgh with whom he had six children. Their younger son, Campbell, was a meteorologist and squadron leader in the RAF Reserve and his death was confirmed in 1943. He is buried at Saumur, France. Crichton-Miller, father, had a long friendship with his contemporary, Professor C.G. Jung of Zurich. He retired from private practice in 1945 and as director of Bowden House in 1952. In old age he developed Parkinson's disease and died in 1959.
