= Helton Godwin Baynes =

Early 20th century British psychologist and disciple of Jung

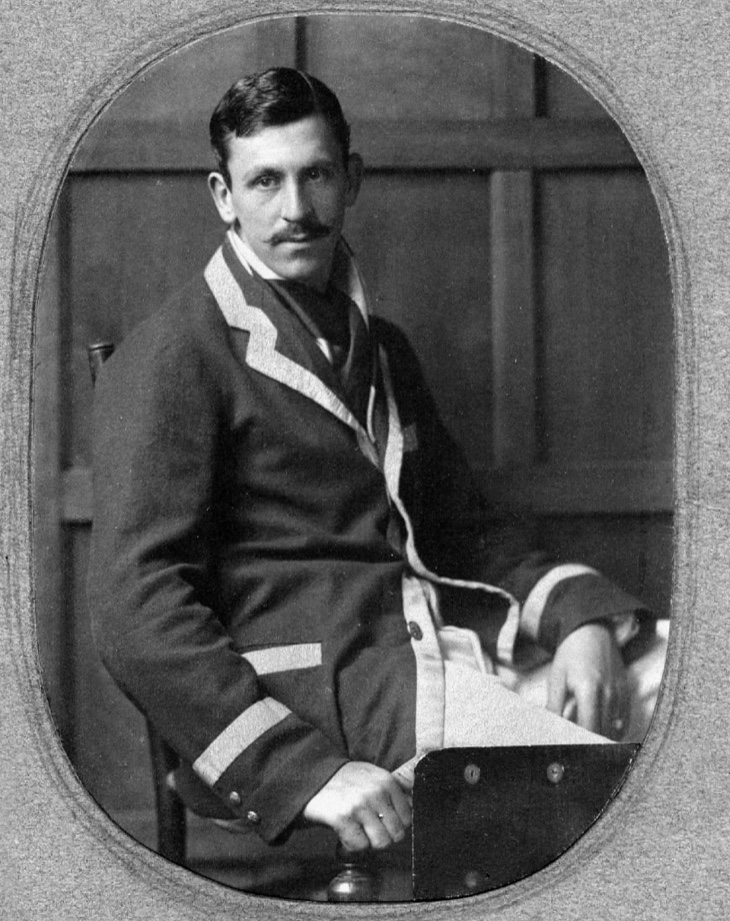
- Godwin Baynes in Leander jacket
- Born: 26 June 1882; Hampstead, London, England
- Died: 6 September 1943 (aged 61); London, England
- Spouse(s): 1. Rosalind Thornycroft, 2.Cary Baynes, aka Cary De Angulo (born Cary Fink)
- Relatives: Daughter, Bridget Rosalin Baynes
- Military career
- Allegiance: United Kingdom
- Branch: British Army
- Service years: 1915–c. 1918
- Unit: RAMC
- Awards: Mentioned in dispatches

Helton Godwin Baynes, also known as Peter Baynes (26 June 1882 – 6 September 1943), was an English physician, army officer, analytical psychologist and author, who was a friend and early translator into English of Carl Jung.

== Life ==
Baynes was educated at Leighton Park School (along with two other leading members of the British Psychoanalytical Society: John Rickman and Lionel Penrose) and then at Trinity College, Cambridge, where he read medicine and where he won Blues for Rowing and Swimming two years running. He graduated MBBS in 1910.

In 1913 he married Rosalind Thornycroft (1891-1973), daughter of Sir William Hamo Thornycroft, their daughters Bridget Rosalind and Chloë were born in 1914 and 1916. Godwin and Rosalind were divorced in 1921. (Rosalind, a friend of D. H. Lawrence, later married the art historian Arthur E. Popham.) In 1927 he married Cary De Angulo. She divorced him in 1931 when he became involved with Agnes Anne Leay. Agnes (known as Anne) and Baynes married and had three further children Michael, Jeremy (known as John) and Diana. Baynes died on 6 September 1943.

== Background ==
Baynes became a House Physician at St Bartholomew's Hospital for his qualifying year, obtaining his M.R.C.S.Eng, L.R.C.P.Lond in 1912. Later he studied hypnotism at La Salpêtrière in Paris. He volunteered to serve in the First Balkan War (1912-1913) and was head of the Red Crescent mission to Turkey and was decorated by Enver Pasha. After practicing in Bethnal Green he moved to Wisbech in late 1913, leaving the town in 1915. He had established a new practice in the Old Market. He served in the RAMC in France, Mesopotamia and Persia and was mentioned in dispatches. During World War I he became interested in Jung's psychology and was part of a group that formed the Analytical Psychology Club after the war. It was modelled on the club convened by Jung in Zurich. In 1922 Baynes went to Zurich for analysis. That year he started collaborating with Cary Angulo, née Fink (1883-1977) in translating Jung. Baynes accompanied Jung on his expedition to East Africa in 1925–26. On his return to the UK, he became one of the chief proponents of the new psychology, and leader of the London club, while others emigrated.

Baynes was a friend of the Fordham family and was supportive of them after Mrs. Fordham died leaving teenage children among whom was the future fellow Trinity alumnus and pioneer Jungian analyst, Michael Fordham. Baynes offered him a first brief analysis in 1933, and after Fordham failed to become an assistant to Jung in Zurich, Baynes saw him again for a period (1935–36) before handing him on to Hildegard Kirsch, a Zurich trained psychologist and refugee from Germany.

== List of selected publications ==
- Mythology of the soul; a research into the unconscious from schizophrenic dreams and drawings, London: Baillière, Tindall and Cox, 1940.
- Germany possessed, 1941. With an introduction by Hermann Rauschning.
- Analytical psychology and the English mind, and other papers, London: Methuen, 1950.
- "Foreword" to Analytical Psychology and the English Mind and Other Papers. London: Methuen and republican. CW 18, 78

Translated into English

- Jung, C. G., tr. Baynes, H. G. (1920). "The Psychological Foundations of Belief in Spirits." Proceedings of the Society for Psychical Research, XXXI:79 (May), 75–93. Read before a Society meeting, London, 4 July 1919.
- Jung, C. G., & Baynes, H. G. (1921). Psychological Types, or, The Psychology of Individuation. London: Kegan Paul Trench Trubner. (Collected Works Vol.6 ISBN 0-691-01813-8) and New York: Harcourt, Brace & Co., 1926. The International Library of Psychology, Philosophy and Scientific Method
- Jung, C. G., Baynes, H. G., & Baynes, C. F. (1928). Contributions to Analytical Psychology. London: Routledge & Kegan Paul.
- Jung, C. G., tr. Baynes, H. G. & Baynes, C. F.(1928) Two essays on analytical psychology. New York, Dodd, Mead and Co.

== Bibliography ==
- Brooke, Rupert; Olivier, Noel (1991). Harris, Pippa (ed.). Song of love: the letters of Rupert Brooke and Noel Olivier. Crown Publishing. ISBN 978-0-517-59090-4. (Full text on Internet Archive)
- Jansen, Diana Baynes (2003). Jung's Apprentice: A Biography of Helton Godwin Baynes. Daimon. ISBN 978-3-85630-626-7.
- BMA (1913). "Wisbech". The British Medical Journal. 2 (2759): 429–430. JSTOR 25307875.
- Elliott, CK (1967). "Dr Helton Godwin Baynes". Annual Report. 28. Wisbech Society: 6–8.
- "Cambridge v. Harvard 1906, Part 1". Hear The Boat Sing. 8 May 2011.
