= Michael Fordham =

British psychiatrist (1905–1995)

- Born: Michael Scott Montague Fordham; 4 August 1905; Kensington, London, England
- Died: 14 April 1995 (aged 89); Buckinghamshire, England
- Education: Cambridge University, St. Bartholomew's Hospital Medical College,
- Known for: Editing the English translation of Jung's Collected Works
- Scientific career
- Fields: Medicine, Child psychiatry, Jungian analysis
- Workplaces: Nottingham Child Guidance Centre, West End Hospital for Nervous Diseases: Child Guidance, Society of Analytical Psychology

Michael Scott Montague Fordham (4 August 1905 – 14 April 1995) was an English child psychiatrist and Jungian analyst. He was a co-editor of the English translation of C. G. Jung's Collected Works. His clinical and theoretical collaboration with psychoanalysts of the object relations school led him to make significant theoretical contributions to what has become known as 'The London School' of analytical psychology in marked contrast to the approach of the C. G. Jung Institute, Zürich. His pioneering research into infancy and childhood led to a new understanding of the self and its relations with the ego. Part of Fordham's legacy is to have shown that the self in its unifying characteristics can transcend the apparently opposing forces that congregate in it and that while engaged in the struggle, it can be exceedingly disruptive both destructively and creatively.

Fordham was instrumental in founding the Society of Analytical Psychology, London, in 1946 and a founder of the Journal of Analytical Psychology, the foremost journal in the field, of which he was editor for 15 years from 1955.

== Background and education ==
The second son of Montague Edward Fordham and his wife Sara Gertrude Worthington, Fordham was born in Kensington, London and was educated at Gresham's School, Holt, Norfolk (1918–1923), where in 1924 Fordham played Don Adriano in a Gresham's School performance of Love's Labour's Lost. In 1920 his mother died. From then on, Fordham was mentored by a friend of the family, Helton Godwin Baynes, who would later influence the young man's career path. He went up to Trinity College, Cambridge (1924–1927) to read Natural science. For his clinical training he attended St Bartholomew's Hospital Medical College (1927–1932). He took the degrees of MB and BCh in 1931, and became an MRCP in 1932.

== Family ==
In 1928, Fordham married Molly Swabey, and their son, Max was born in 1933. In 1940, their marriage was dissolved and he married, secondly, Frieda Hoyle, a social worker and later also an analyst.

== Career ==
On completing his medical qualification in 1932, Fordham's first post was as a House Officer (Junior Medical Officer) at Long Grove Mental Hospital in Epsom, Surrey. The following year he began to read Jung's writings. In 1934 he was appointed as a registrar in Child Psychiatry, London Child Guidance Clinic. The same year he entered into a personal analysis with H. G. Baynes and visited Zurich to meet Jung, intending to train with him. He was disappointed in this quest and returned to London. In 1935 he began a year as a General Practitioner in Barking, Essex, and terminated his analysis with Baynes and switched to the Jung-trained Hildegard Kirsch, married to another Jungian, James Kirsch, the couple having moved to England to escape Nazi Germany. Also in 1936, he took up a part-time consultant's post at a Child Guidance clinic in Nottingham, in the Midlands. At the out-break of the Second World War, he remained in Nottingham, and his marriage came to an end by 1940. Also in 1940, his analyst, Hildegard Kirsch, emigrated to the United States.

In 1942 a new phase of his life began. He married his second wife, and was appointed consultant psychiatrist to evacuated children in the Nottingham area. In 1943 his long-time mentor and friend H. G. Baynes died. In 1945 he became a co-editor of English translation of C. G. Jung's Collected Works for the publishing houses of Routledge & Kegan Paul and Princeton University Press. Later that year, he became a co-founder with seven colleagues, of the Society of Analytical Psychology – SAP – in London. In the 1970s he would also finally establish a separate Jungian training for analysts wishing to specialise in work with children and adolescents.

With the move back to the capital, he took up the post of Consultant to the Child Guidance Clinic at the West End Hospital for Nervous Diseases. In 1947 he obtained the Degree of MD. He continued the monumental work of editing Jung's then published works that eventually grew to 20 volumes, and kept up a correspondence with Jung, sometimes needing to be extremely diplomatic in tackling 'inconsistencies'.

Throughout the next decades he ran a private analytic practice and had a role in the Tavistock Clinic teaching trainees involved in baby observations. He lectured and wrote papers and books. With his wife he played a pivotal role in training the next generation of Jungian analysts and making major theoretical contributions. In 1971 he was honoured by becoming a Founder Fellow of the Royal College of Psychiatrists.

=== The London-Zurich split ===
The 1970s were marked by increased tensions over the theoretical direction the SAP should take. Two camps developed: the one led by Jung disciple and refugee from Germany, Gerhard Adler, who promoted the Archetypal school, aligned to classical teaching and the other, led by Fordham, who had been declined by Jung and who impressed upon trainees and younger colleagues, the discipline of the psychoanalytic 'Independent Group', who laid great stress on examining early child development in the analysis of adults and working with the transference. Until Fordham's systematic approach to this area, Jung's intuitions on the subject had not been followed up at the Zurich Institute, pace the Swiss 'lay' analyst Dora Kalff, who ran with Dr. Margaret Lowenfeld's idea of engaging children in diagnostic sandplay. These differences proved organisationally and personally insuperable, and Adler and his supporters left the SAP to form an alternative organisation in 1977. Fordham was inspired by Jung, but was not a Jungian. This nuance was expressed in Fordham's text on the occasion of Jung's death in 1961:

His name is still automatically linked with that of Freud as most nearly Freud's equal, and if his main life's work was in the end to be founded on a personal and scientific incompatibility with Freud, there are those who believe, like myself, that this was a disaster, and in part an illusion, from which we suffer and will continue to do so until we have repaired the damage. [...] the best monument that can be raised to Jung's memory is to make use of and develop his work rather than let it be passively accepted and sterilised.

=== Later years ===
After the death in 1988 of his second wife, Frieda (Hoyle, née Rothwell), Fordham moved to a Quaker community in Chalfont St Peter Buckinghamshire, where he continued a small practice, welcomed visitors and followed cricket. He died there on 14 April 1995, in his 90th year.

== Fordham's theoretical contributions ==
=== The primary self ===
In 1947 Fordham proposed a distinct theory of the primary self to describe the state of the psyche of neonates, characterised by homeostasis, or 'steady state' as he calls it, where self and other are undifferentiated, where there is no distinction between the internal and external world, and where there are as yet no different components in the internal world. This idea Fordham derived partly from the Jungian concept of the archetype of the self, and the psychoanalytic idea of internal 'objects'. The primary self, taken as the original totality of each person, with its 'archetypal' tendencies to develop aspects, such as language, etc., enters into relation with the external world through a dual process of de-integration and re-integration.

=== De-integration and re-integration ===
Fordham coined the term deintegration - as opposed to disintegration - to denote a state akin to the Kleinian depressive position, where, as a result of a sense of major ruptures, or loss of contact with feeling fed and contained, a deep sense of disappearance, perhaps even of non-being ensues. However, this is usually temporary until the next feed or contact with mother restores the sense of 'one-ness' and well-being and hence, 're-integration'. The swings between these two extreme states is a form of Enantiodromia in Jungian terms. In the case of a baby it corresponds to a pattern of experiencing a need, feeling 'disappointment' until it is stemmed, and 'satisfaction' when the basic needs are more, or less, successfully met. These experiences in turn activate the inherent internal 'archetypal' dynamics of the baby's perceptions and expectations and so begin the foundations of the person's internal and social development, through a more or less unconscious process of adaptation and learning. The baby's posited initial 'sense' of wholeness with mother is thus subjected to different levels of turbulence and there is a necessary experience of loss of that wholeness as the baby grows in awareness of being separate from mother (and the outer world) during this process. With the entry into infancy the child has to struggle with the extent and limitations of his will (agency) and power over his environment and learn to contend with internal images and sense impressions that now populate the mind and senses. It is also the time when pathways are established for the future formation of complexes, when reactions to certain stimuli remain trapped in the unconscious. This stage is sometimes popularly characterised as 'the terrible twos'. Inklings of self-awareness may also come into this early process. The process itself continues into adult life.

== Legacy ==
The Michael Fordham Prize is awarded for exceptionally innovative articles submitted to the Journal of Analytical Psychology.

== Publications ==
His publications include:

- The Life of Childhood, London: Routledge (1944)
- New Developments in Analytical Psychology (1957)
- The Objective Psyche (1958)
- Children as Individuals, London: Hodder & Stoughton (1969, revised from The Life of Childhood)
- The Self and Autism (1976)
- Jungian Psychotherapy (1978) London: John Wiley & Sons Ltd.
- The Making of an Analyst: a memoir (London: Free Association Books, 1993)

From 1945, Fordham was co-editor of the English translation of The Collected Works of C. G. Jung.

From 1955 to 1970 he was editor of the Journal of Analytical Psychology

== Sources ==
- The Making of an Analyst: a memoir by Michael Fordham (London, Free Association Books, 1993)
- Obituary Notice of Michael Fordham in Journal of Analytical Psychology, volume 40, No. 3, pp. 430–431
- Obituary in The Independent, 25 April 1995
- "Michael Fordham (1905–1995).", The Journal of Analytical Psychology, 40 (3): 418–34, July 1995, ISSN 0021-8774, PMID 7649848
- Hobdell, R (July 1986), "A bibliography of the writings of Michael Fordham.", The Journal of Analytical Psychology, 31 (3): 307–15, doi:10.1111/j.1465-5922.1986.00307.x, PMID 3528105
- Fordham Michael (1998). Roger Hobdell (ed.). Freud, Jung, Klein-- the Fenceless Field: Essays on Psychoanalysis and Analytical Psychology. Routledge. ISBN 978-0-415186155.
- Hubback, J (July 1986), "Frieda Fordham's influence on Michael", The Journal of Analytical Psychology, 31 (3): 243–6, doi:10.1111/j.1465-5922.1986.00243.x, PMID 3528104
- Hubback, J (July 1986), "Fordham the clinician as seen in his writings", The Journal of Analytical Psychology, 31 (3): 235–42, doi:10.1111/j.1465-5922.1986.00235.x, PMID 3528103
- "Michael Fordham re-viewed", The Journal of Analytical Psychology, 31 (3): 195–315, July 1986, doi:10.1111/j.1465-5922.1986.00195.x, PMID 3528101
