= International Association for Analytical Psychology =

- Formation: 1955
- Headquarters: Zurich, Switzerland
- Members: 58 societies, groups and affiliates worldwide
- President: Misser Berg – from 2022
- Website: iaap.org

The International Association for Analytical Psychology (IAAP) is the international accrediting and regulatory body for all societies and groups of analytical psychology practitioners, trainees, and affiliates. Analytical psychology was founded by Carl Gustav Jung.

The association is based in Zurich and was founded in 1955 by Jung and a group of international analysts. It has member associations and affiliates in 58 countries.

== Objectives ==
The main objectives of the IAAP are to advance the understanding and utility of analytical psychology worldwide, and to ensure that the highest professional, scientific and ethical standards are maintained in the training and practice of analytical psychologists among its member groups.

== See also ==
- Society of Analytical Psychology
- British Psychotherapy Foundation
