= Sabina Spielrein =

Russian physician and psychoanalyst (1885–1942)

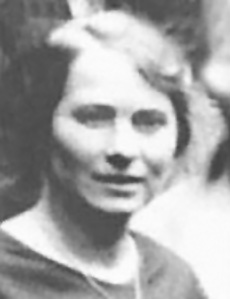
- Born: Sheyve (Elisheva) Naftulovna Spielrein; 7 November 1885 OS; Rostov-on-Don, Russian Empire
- Died: 11 August 1942 (aged 56); Zmievskaya Balka, Rostov-on-Don, Russian SFSR, Soviet Union
- Education: University of Zurich (M.D., 1911)
- Known for: death instinct child psychotherapy psycholinguistics
- Spouse: Pavel Nahumovich Sheftel (m. 1912; died 1936)
- Scientific career
- Fields: Psychotherapy; Psychoanalysis
- Workplaces: Rousseau Institute
- Doctoral advisor: Eugen Bleuler; Carl Jung
- Notable students: Alexander Luria; Lev Vygotsky

Sabina Nikolayevna Spielrein (Russian: Сабина Николаевна Шпильрейн, IPA: [sɐˈbʲinə nʲɪkɐˈlajɪvnə ʂpʲɪlʲˈrɛjn]; 7 November [O.S. 26 October] 1885 – 11 August 1942) was a Russian physician and one of the first female psychoanalysts.

She was first the patient of Carl Gustav Jung, then the student of Jung, then eventually his colleague. She also had an intimate relationship with Jung during 1908–1910, as is documented in their correspondence from the time and her diaries. Spielrein also met, corresponded with, and had a collegial relationship with Sigmund Freud. Spielrein also worked with and psychoanalysed Swiss developmental psychologist Jean Piaget.

Spielrein worked as a psychiatrist, psychoanalyst, teacher and paediatrician in Switzerland and Russia. In her thirty-year professional career, she published over 35 papers in three languages (German, French and Russian), covering psychoanalysis, developmental psychology, psycholinguistics and educational psychology. Among her works in the field of psychoanalysis is the essay titled "Die Destruktion als Ursache des Werdens"written in German in 1912, published in English as "Destruction as the Cause of Coming Into Being". Spielrein was a pioneer of psychoanalysis and one of the first to introduce the concept of the Todestrieb (in Freudian analysis called the death drive; sometimes referred to as the "death instinct" in layman's terms).

Spielrein was one of the first psychoanalysts to conduct a case study on early concepts of schizophrenia, and to have a dissertation appear in a psychoanalytic journal.

Spielrein is increasingly recognized as an important and innovative thinker who was marginalized in history because of her unusual eclecticism, refusal to join factions, and feminist approach to psychology.

Sabina Spielrein was killed during the Holocaust on August 11, 1942, by a Nazi SS death squad, during a mass execution of Jews at the Zmievskaya Balka ravine in Rostov-on-Don, Soviet Union.

== Biography ==
=== Family and early life, 1885–1904 ===
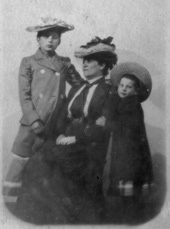
Sabina Spielrein as child (left), with her mother and sister.

She was born in 1885 into a wealthy Jewish family in Rostov-on-Don, Russian Empire. Her mother Eva (born Khave) Lublinskaya was the daughter and granddaughter of rabbis from Yekaterinoslav. Eva trained as a dentist, but did not practice. Sabina's father Nikolai (born Naftul) Spielrein was an agronomist. After moving from Warsaw to Rostov, he became a successful merchant. On her birth certificate, Sabina appeared as Sheyve Naftulovna, but throughout her life and on official documents she used the name Sabina Nikolayevna. She was the eldest of five children. All three of her brothers later became eminent scientists. One of them, Isaac Spielrein, was a Soviet psychologist, a pioneer of work psychology. Another was the mathematician Jan Spielrein. From her early childhood, Sabina was highly imaginative and believed that she had a 'higher calling' to achieve greatness, and she communicated about this privately with a 'guardian spirit'. However, her parents' marriage was turbulent and she experienced physical violence from both of them. She suffered from multiple somatic symptoms and obsessions. Some commentators believe she may have been sexually abused by someone in the family. She attended a Froebel school followed by the Yekaterinskaya Gymnasium in Rostov, where she excelled in science, music and languages. She learned to speak three languages fluently. During her teens, she continued to be troubled emotionally and became infatuated first with her history teacher, then with a paternal uncle. While at school, she resolved to go abroad to train as a doctor, with the approval of her rabbinic grandfather. She completed her medical degree with honors.

=== Hospital admission, 1904–1905 ===
Following the sudden death of her only sister Emilia from typhoid, Spielrein's mental health started to deteriorate, and at the age of 18 she suffered a breakdown with severe hysteria including tics, grimaces, and uncontrollable laughing and crying. After an unsuccessful stay in a Swiss sanatorium, where she developed another infatuation with one of the doctors, she was admitted to the Burghölzli mental hospital near Zürich in August 1904. Its director was Eugen Bleuler, who ran it as a therapeutic community with social activities for the patients including gardening, drama and scientific lectures. One of Bleuler's assistants was Carl Jung, afterwards appointed as deputy director. In the days following her admission, Spielrein disclosed to Jung that her father had often beaten her, and that she was troubled by masochistic fantasies of being beaten. Bleuler ensured that she was separated from her family, later requiring her father and brothers to have no contact with her. She made a rapid recovery, and by October was able to apply for medical school and to start assisting Jung with word association tests in his laboratory. Between October and January, Jung carried out word association tests on her, and also used some rudimentary psychoanalytic techniques. Later, he referred to her twice in letters to Freud as his first analytic case, although in his publications he referred to two later patients in these terms. During her admission, Spielrein fell in love with Jung. By her own choice, she continued as a resident in the hospital from January to June 1905, although she was no longer receiving treatment. She worked as an intern alongside other Russian students there including Max Eitingon, as well as expatriate psychiatrists who were studying with Bleuler, including Karl Abraham.

=== Medical student, 1905–1911 ===
She attended medical school at the University of Zurich from June 1905 to January 1911, excelling there academically. Her diaries show a very broad range of interests and reading including philosophy, religion, Russian literature and evolutionary biology. She lived in several different apartments, mixing in a social circle of predominately fellow Russian Jewish women medical students. Many of these, together with Spielrein, became fascinated with the emerging movement of psychoanalysis in western Europe, and studied with Bleuler and Jung. Spielrein's main focus while in medical school was on psychiatry. A number of the students, like Spielrein, subsequently became psychiatrists, spent time with Freud in Vienna, and published in psychoanalytic journals. These included Esther Aptekman, Fanya Chalevsky, Sheina Grebelskaya and Tatiana Rosenthal. Politically, Spielrein identified with socialism, although some of her Russian student contemporaries were followers of the Socialist Revolutionary Party or of Zionism.

Supervised first by Bleuler and then by Jung, Spielrein completed her medical school dissertation, a close study of the language of a patient with schizophrenia. It was published in the Jahrbuch für psychoanalytische und psychopathologische Forschungen, which Jung edited. She was one of the first people to conduct a case study on schizophrenia and have it published in a psychoanalytic journal. Freud referenced it in the same volume in his postscript to the Schreber Case; It was the first doctorate to appear in a psychoanalytic journal. Her dissertation contributed greatly to the understanding of the language of people with schizophrenia. It focused more attention on the mental illness and highlighted the need for more research. It was also the first dissertation written by a woman that was psychoanalytically oriented. She left Zürich the day after graduation, having resolved to establish an independent career as a psychoanalyst elsewhere.

=== Relationship with Carl Jung ===
While at medical school, Spielrein continued to assist Jung in the laboratory as she had done as an in-patient. She also attended his ward rounds and met him socially. The strong feelings she had developed towards him as his hospital patient continued during her first three years at medical school, and she developed a fantasy of having a child with him to be called Siegfried. She did not have further therapy from him, although from around late 1907 he informally tried to analyze her wish for his child. In the summer of 1908, as she entered her fourth year at medical school, she and Jung began to have increasingly intimate encounters, which she described in her diaries as "poetry". There are differing views as to whether they had sexual intercourse. John Launer has reviewed the evidence from her diaries and their letters in his 2015 biography of Spielrein, Sex Versus Survival: The Life and Ideas of Sabina Spielrein. He concluded that they had consensual and erotic physical contact but stopped short of sexual penetration. This is supported by Spielrein's statement in a letter to her mother: "So far we have stayed at the level of poetry that is not dangerous." Lance Owens further summarized the documentary evidence in his 2015 study, Jung in Love: The Mysterium in Liber Novus. Zvi Lothane, a Freudian psychoanalyst and scholar of psychoanalytic history, makes the most robust and well-supported case against a consummated sexual relationship between the pair. Lothane summarizes his conclusions:

People tend to believe as dictated by their own emotions, projections, and transferences. ... Our judgment should really be guided by what the protagonists never tired of asserting themselves: that there was no sex. In the final analysis the question is whether we believe their testimony or not. I choose to believe them, and not out of prudery, but because in those days people saw premarital sexual relations, especially as applies to Spielrein, differently than we do today; moreover, because unconsummated sexual desire was even more poignant and more romantic than consummated sex. However, the sexual myth dies hard, providing sensational material for a number of theatrical productions and a plethora of articles in the popular press and professional journals.

During the ensuing months, Jung wrote to Freud about the relationship, at first accusing Spielrein of having tried unsuccessfully to seduce him, and then admitting that he had become romantically involved with her. He sent a series of letters to Spielrein's mother, writing "no one can prevent two friends from doing as they wish...the likelihood is that something more may enter the relationship". Spielrein also wrote to Freud, making it clear that, for a few months, their relationship had been in some fashion physical, involving what Spielrein again called "poetry": "In the end the unavoidable happened...it reached the point where he could no longer stand it and wanted 'poetry'. I could not and did not want to resist, for many reasons". Eva Spielrein threatened to report him to Eugen Bleuler and came to Zürich to do so, but in the end decided not to. Meanwhile, Jung had resigned his medical post at the Burghölzli, although he continued his laboratory work and university teaching. A document-based account of these events, including the three-way correspondence among Spielrein, Jung and Freud, appears in Launer's biography.

After a hiatus of several months caused by the tension, Spielrein and Jung resumed their relationship in the summer of 1909, and continued seeing each other privately up through the last months of 1910. Spielrein permanently departed Zürich around January 1911. In Spielrein's private diary entry dated 11 September 1910—just four months before graduating from medical school, and leaving both Jung and Zürich—she mused again upon her fantasy of bearing Jung's son. Sabina saw in reality how totally impossible it was, how it would ruin her chance of finding another love and destroy her scientific and professional ambitions:

With a baby I would be accepted nowhere. And that would be in the best of cases; what if I did not even get pregnant? Then our pure friendship would be destroyed by the intimate relationship, and our friendship is what is so terribly dear to me.

Written shortly before her departure from Zürich, these words seemingly imply that whatever the nature of their physical "poetry", Jung and Spielrein had not engaged in sexual intercourse.

Some commentators have seen Jung's conduct as a professional boundary violation, while others have seen it as an unintended and forgivable consequence of early experimentation with psychoanalytic techniques. The historian and Freudian psychoanalyst Bruno Bettelheim commented on her treatment and the apparently beneficial result, noting that, "However questionable Jung's behaviour was from a moral point of view...somehow it met the prime obligation of the therapist towards his patient: to cure her". By contrast, Peter Loewenberg (among others) has argued that it was in breach of professional ethics, and that it "jeopardized his position at the Burghölzli and led to his rupture with Bleuler and his departure from the University of Zurich".

At the time, Freud was tolerant of what happened between Jung and Spielrein, and regarded it as an example of countertransference. Later, he confessed to Spielrein that it had played a part in the schism between him and Jung: "His behavior was too bad. My opinion changed a great deal from the time I received that first letter from you". The relationship between Jung and Spielrein demonstrated to Freud that a therapist's emotions and humanity could not be kept out of the psychoanalytic relationship. Jung had come to the same conclusion. Before this episode, Freud apparently believed that a doctor could numb his emotions when analyzing patients. When Jung came to Freud about his relationship with Spielrein, Freud changed his ideas about the relationship between doctor and patient. Spielrein seems to have regarded her experiences with Jung as overall more beneficial than otherwise. She continued to yearn for him for several years afterwards, and wrote to Freud that she found it harder to forgive Jung for leaving the psychoanalytic movement than for "that business with me".

Spielrein sometimes is regarded as having been the inspiration for Jung's conception of the anima, in part due to a reference Jung made 50 years later in Memories, Dreams, Reflections—the biographical memoir compiled and edited by Aniela Jaffé—to an imaginatively encountered interior feminine voice that awakened his awareness of the interior anima. He recounted, it was "the voice of a patient ... who had a strong transference to me". However, in the unpublished transcript of Jung's comments recorded by Aniela Jaffé in 1957, Jung made it clear this woman was Maria Moltzer and not Spielrein. Nonetheless, Lance Owens has documented that the relationship with Spielrein was indeed crucial to Jung's evolving understanding of what he much later termed the anima.

=== Career, 1912–1920 – the "Destruction" paper ===
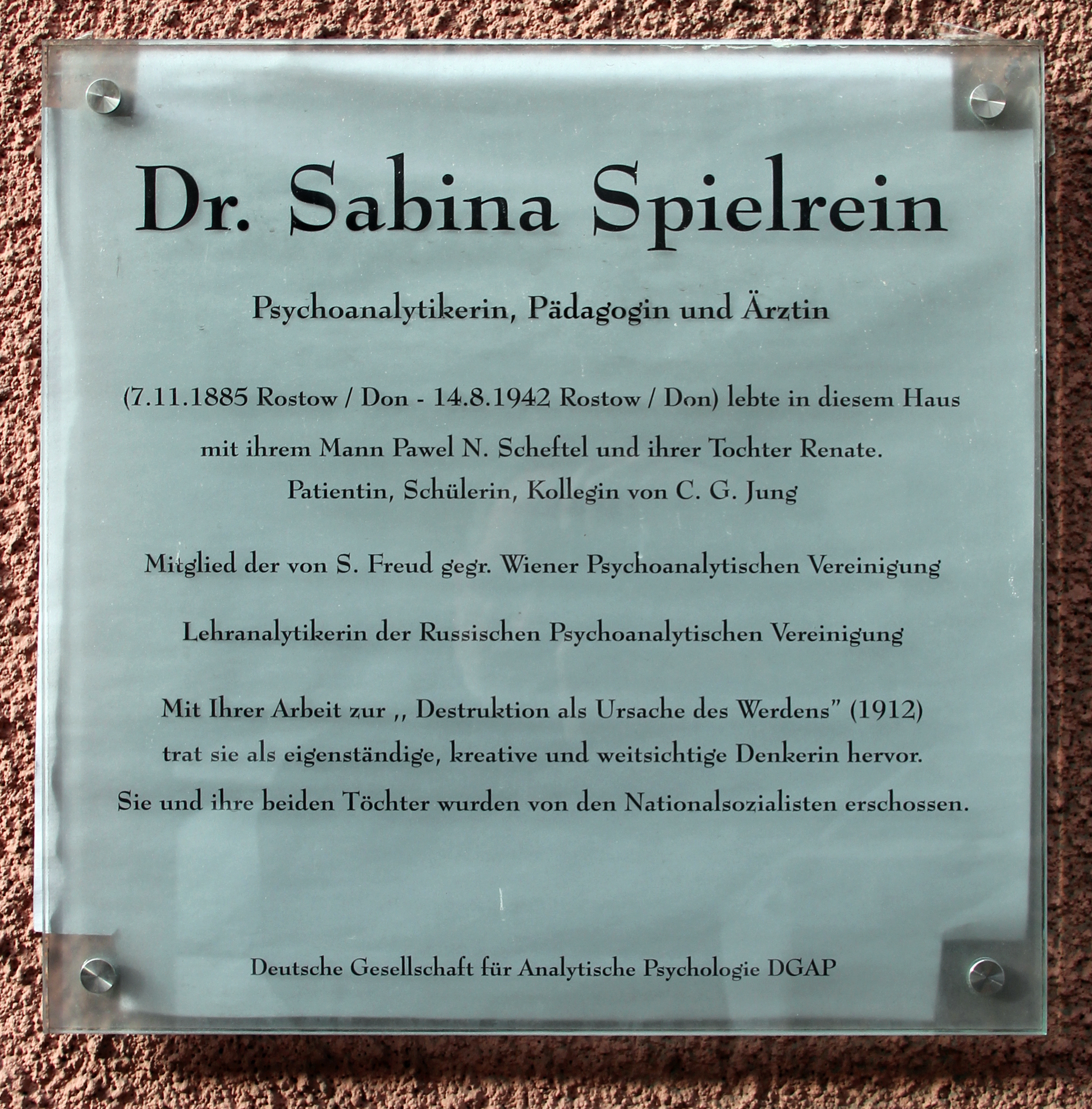
Memorial plaque at former residence of Sabina Spielrein in Berlin, Germany

After graduation, Spielrein moved to Munich, Germany, to study art history, while also working on a paper on the connection between sex and death. In October she moved to Vienna, Austria, where she was elected a member of the Vienna Psychoanalytic Society (she was the second female member of this society, and the youngest woman). Spielrein delivered her paper to the Society on 27 November, 1912 as "Destruction as the Cause of Coming into Being", publishing an amended version the following year in the Jahrbuch. The paper shows evidence of both Jungian and Freudian thought, but appears to mark the point at which she moved from identifying herself with Jung to seeing herself as more of a Freudian. Freud explicitly mentioned her paper in a famous footnote to Beyond the Pleasure Principle, acknowledging that it started the train of thought which led him to conceptualize the death drive: "A considerable part of this speculation has been anticipated in [her] work". Spielrein's concept, however, was different from Freud's, in that she saw destructiveness as serving the reproductive instinct rather than one in its own right. Spielrein met with Freud on a number of occasions in 1912, and continued to correspond with him until 1923. She attempted in her correspondence with both Freud and Jung to reconcile the two men. In the "Destruction" paper, and throughout her subsequent career, she drew on ideas from many different disciplines and schools of thought. At age 26, she was one of the youngest women to publish in psychoanalysis.

In 1912, Spielrein married the Russian Jewish physician Pavel Nahumovitch Sheftel. They moved to Berlin, where Spielrein worked alongside Karl Abraham. Spielrein had her first daughter, Irma-Renata (known as Renata), in 1913. While in Berlin, Spielrein published nine further papers. One of these was an account of children's beliefs about sex and reproduction, in which she included recollections of her own early fantasies about this. Entitled 'Contribution to the Understanding of a Child's Soul', it shows her in more Freudian mode than her previous papers. In another paper, entitled 'The Mother-in-Law', she gave a sympathetic account of the role of mothers-in-law and the relationship between them and their daughters-in-law. The Dutch psychoanalyst Van Waning has commented on this paper: "Women's studies – in the year 1913!". Another paper from the time recounts her treatment of a child with a phobia of animals, and is one of the first known reports of child psychotherapy

At the outbreak of World War I, she returned to Switzerland, living briefly in Zürich again before relocating to Lausanne, where she and Renata remained for the rest of the war. Her husband joined his regiment in Kiev, and they were not reunited for more than a decade. The war years were times of privation for Spielrein: she did some work as a surgeon and in an eye clinic, but also received contributions from her parents when they could get these to her. She did, however, manage to publish two more short papers during the war years. She composed music, and considered becoming a musical composer. She also began to write a novel in French. She recorded observations of her daughter's development in terms of language and play. She continued her correspondence with Freud and Jung and her development of her own theoretical ideas, particularly in relation to attachment in children.

=== Career in Geneva, 1920–1923 – work with Jean Piaget ===
In 1920, she attended the sixth congress of the International Psychoanalytical Association in The Hague, where she gave a talk on the origins of language in childhood. The audience included Sigmund Freud, his daughter Anna Freud, Melanie Klein and Sandor Ferenczi. She also announced her intention to join the staff of the Rousseau Institute in Geneva, a pioneering clinical, training and research centre for child development. She remained there for three years, working alongside its founder Édouard Claparède, as well as other distinguished psychologists of the time including Pierre Bovet. While she was there, Jean Piaget also joined the staff: they collaborated closely, and in 1921 he went into an eight-month analysis with her. In 1922, she and Piaget both delivered papers at the seventh congress of the International Psychoanalytical Association in Berlin. This was one of the most productive periods of her life, and she published twenty papers between 1920 and 1923. The most important of these was a new version of the paper she had given at the Hague on the origins of language, drawing on her collaboration with the linguist Charles Bally. Entitled "The origins of the words 'Papa' and 'Mama'", she described how language develops on a substrate of genetic readiness, first through interactions between the child and the mother's breast, and then through family and social interactions. Her other papers from the time are mainly devoted to bring psychoanalytic thought together with observational studies of child development,. Her papers in the Zeitschrift and Imago from this time mainly focus on the importance of speech acquisition in early childhood and the sense of time. However, Otto Fenichel singled out for special mention her 1923 article on voyeurism, where "Sabina Spielrein described a peeping perversion in which the patient tried to overcome an early repression of genital and manual erotogeneity, provoked by an intense castration fear". Overall, her work during this period is thought to have had considerable influence on Piaget's thought, and possibly on Klein's.

In 1923, discouraged by her lack of success in building up a private practice in Geneva, and with Freud's support, she decided to travel to Moscow to support the development of psychoanalysis there. She planned to return to Geneva, and left her personal papers, including all her diaries and correspondence, in the basement of the Rousseau Institute. In the event, she never returned to western Europe, and the papers remained undiscovered until they were identified nearly sixty years later by the Jungian analyst Aldo Carotenuto, who published a selection of them. The archive remains in the possession of the heirs of Édouard Claparède, and although further selections have been published in a number of books and journals, it has never been fully examined or catalogued.

=== Russian career, 1923–1942 ===
Psychoanalysis in Russia had already endured a turbulent history, but its influence was strongest between 1921 and 1923. On her arrival in Moscow, Spielrein found herself the most experienced psychoanalyst there, as well as one of the most closely connected with analysts and psychologists in the west. She was appointed to a chair in child psychology at First Moscow University, and took up work in pedology, an approach to pediatrics that integrated it with developmental and educational psychology. She also joined the Moscow Psychoanalytic Institute, which had been founded in 1922 under the direction of Moise (Moishe) Wulff. She then became involved with an ambitious new project in children's learning known as the "Detski Dom" Psychoanalytic Orphanage–Laboratory (also known as the "White House.")

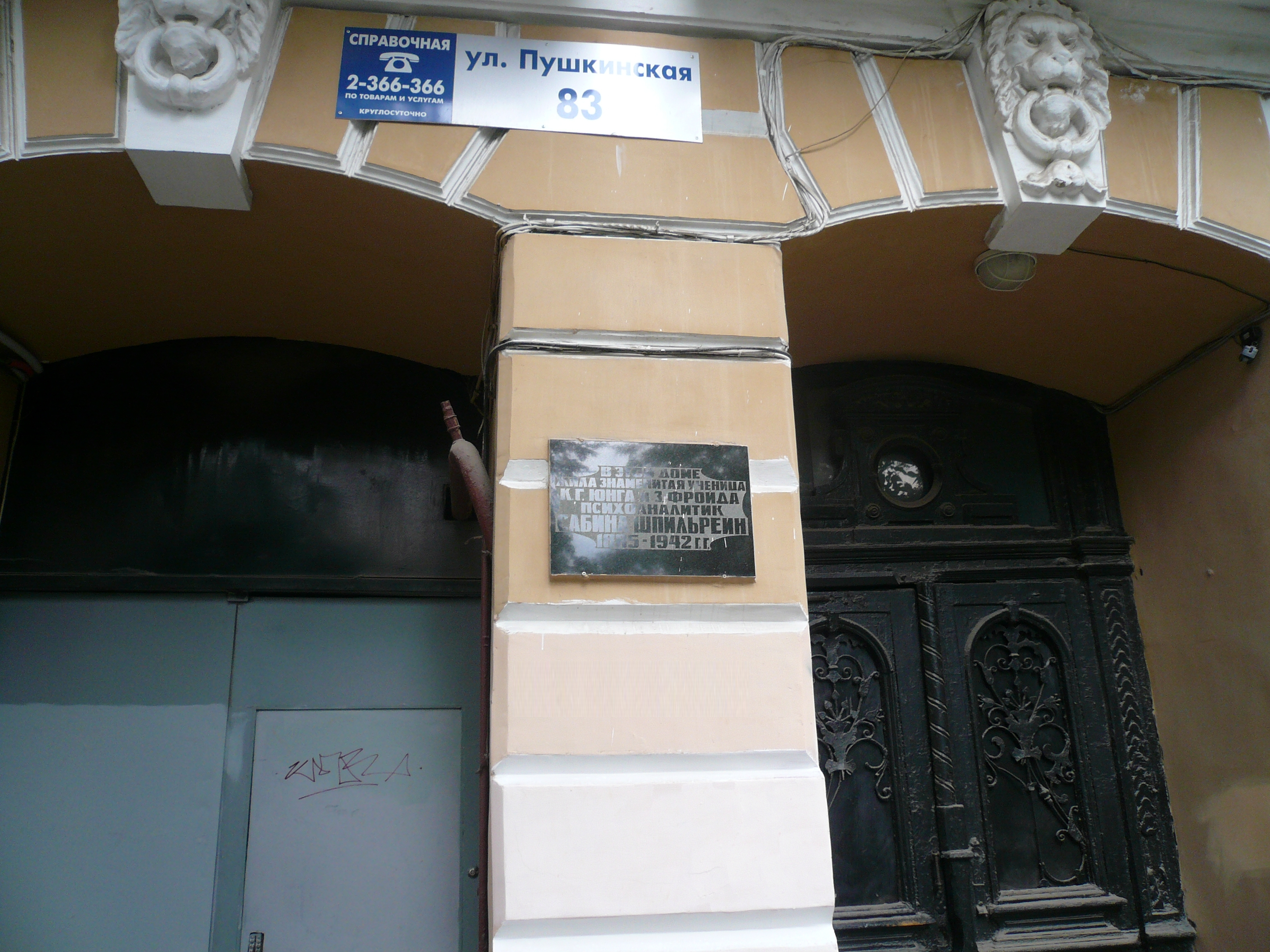
Memorial plaque on the Spielrein Mansion, where Sabina Spielrein lived at 83 Pushkinskaya Street, Rostov-on-Don. The sign says: "In this house lived the famous student of C. G. Jung and S. Freud, psychoanalyst Sabina Spielrein (1885–1942)"

Founded in 1921 by Vera Schmidt (who had also been one of Freud's students), the "Detski Dom" was intended to teach children based on Freud's theories. The school was only an orphanage in name: along with Schmidt's own son, the school had children from prominent Bolsheviks (including Joseph Stalin, whose son Vasily Stalin was enrolled as well). Use of discipline was avoided and children were allowed maximum freedom of movement. Sexual exploration and curiosity was also permitted. Spielrein's involvement included supervision of the teachers, and she may have supported them in a protest about their poor work conditions, a protest that led to their dismissal. The school had to close in 1924, in the wake of accusations of experiments to stimulate the children's sexuality prematurely. The accusations were possibly made in response to attempts by Leon Trotsky to proletarianize the school's intake.

During Spielrein's time in Moscow, both Alexander Luria and Lev Vygotsky came to work at the Psychoanalytic Institute and "Dyetski Dom" and studied with her. Spielrein's characteristic way of combining subjective psychological ideas from psychoanalysis with objective observational research of children is likely to have been an important influence in their early formation as researchers, leading them to become the foremost Russian psychologists of their time.

In late 1924 or 1925, Spielrein left Moscow. She and her daughter rejoined her husband Pavel in Rostov-on-Don. As well as probably being disillusioned by her experience in Moscow, Spielrein may have been impelled to return because her husband by now was in a relationship with a Ukrainian woman, Olga Snetkova (born Aksyuk), and they now had a daughter, Nina. Pavel returned to his wife, and their second daughter Eva was born in 1926.

For at least the next decade, Spielrein continued to work actively as a pediatrician, carrying out further research, lecturing on psychoanalysis, and publishing in the west until 1931. In 1929 she presented a vigorous defense of Freud and psychoanalysis at a congress of psychiatry and neuropathology in Rostov, possibly the last person to mount such a defense at a time when psychoanalysis was on the point of being proscribed in Russia. The paper also made it clear that she was up-to-date with developments in the west, and included sympathetic comments on the approach of Sandor Ferenczi, who was advocating a more emotionally engaged role for the therapist. She also spoke of the importance of clinical supervision for psychological work with children, and described an approach to short-term therapy that could be used when resources did not allow for extensive treatment.

Her niece Menikha described her from the 1930s as "a very well mannered, friendly and gentle person. At the same time, she was tough as far as her convictions were concerned." Her husband died in 1936. In 1937 her brothers Isaac, Jan and Emil Spielrein were arrested; they were executed in 1937 and 1938 during the Great Purge. Spielrein came to an agreement with her husband's former partner, Olga Snetkova, that if either of them died, the surviving woman would care for their three daughters.

=== Death ===
Spielrein and her daughters survived the first German invasion of Rostov-on-Don in November 1941, which was repelled by the Red Army. However, in July 1942, the German army reoccupied the city. On August 11, 1942, Spielrein and her two daughters, aged 29 and 16, were murdered by an SS death squad, Einsatzgruppe D, in Zmievskaya Balka, or "Snake Ravine" near Rostov-on-Don, together with 27,000 mostly Jewish victims. Although most of the members of the Spielrein family were murdered in the Holocaust, the wives and children of her brothers all survived.

== Legacy ==
Despite her closeness to the central figures of both psychoanalysis and developmental psychology in the first part of the twentieth century, Spielrein was more or less forgotten in Western Europe after her departure for Moscow in 1923. Her tragic murder in the Holocaust contributed to the dearth of the knowledge of her contributions to psychoanalysis. The 1974 publication of the correspondence between Freud and Jung, followed by the discovery of her personal papers and publication of some of them from the 1980s onwards, made her name quite widely known, however, it also led to her identification in popular culture as an sexual sideshow in the lives of the two men.

Within the world of psychoanalysis, Spielrein has until very recently been given usually no more than a footnote, first for her view of the sexual drive as containing both an instinct of destruction and an instinct of transformation (hence anticipating both Freud's "death drive" and Jung's views on "transformation"), second for the role of her relationship with Jung in inspiring Freud's concepts of transference and countertransference.

In recent years, Spielrein has been increasingly recognized as a significant thinker in her own right, influencing not only Jung, Freud, and Melanie Klein, but also later psychologists, including Jean Piaget, Alexander Luria, and Lev Vygotsky. Spielrein's work has also been influential in research on gender roles, love, intuition, the unconscious, dream interpretation, sexuality and sexual urges, libido, sublimation, transference, linguistics, and childhood language development.

Alexander Etkind's research in Russia in the 1990s shows that Spielrein did not "disappear" after leaving Western Europe, but continued as an active clinician and researcher. The publication in 2003 of a book of collected essays about her work, Sabina Spielrein, Forgotten Pioneer of Psychoanalysis, stimulated interest in her as an original thinker. The first scholarly biography of her in German, by Sabine Richebächer, places her relationship with Jung in its proper context of a lifelong career of involvement with psychoanalysis and psychology.

Lance Owens suggests that the importance of Spielrein's relationship with Jung should not be historically discounted, but seen as an additional part of her legacy and broad creative influence. Owens provides evidence that Spielrein played a seminal role in Jung's personal psychological development, his understanding of love, and his subsequent formation of core psychological conceptualizations about "anima" and "transference".

Followers of feminist and relational psychoanalysis are also beginning to claim her as an important progenitor. The 2015 congress of the American Psychoanalytic Association marked a milestone in reclaiming Spielrein and her thought, when the opening plenary lecture by Adrienne Harris, "The Clinical and Theoretical Contributions of Sabina Spielrein", credited her with pioneering relational psychoanalysis.

Through her work on child analysis, Spielrein differentiated between autistic (or primary) languages and social languages (like song, words, etc.). She also developed an exciting theory in the context of child development explaining the meaning of a mother's breast.

In November 2015, the Memorial Museum Sabina Shpilereyn [sic] was opened in the Spielrein Mansion, her childhood home in Rostov.

== Biographical publications ==
Two main biographies in English exist on Sabina Spielrein's life. A more straightforward English-language biography of Spielrein was written by Angela M. Sells, Sabina Spielrein: The Woman and the Myth, which was published by SUNY Press in 2017.

An earlier biography of Sabina Spielrein (written in English, and with the support of the Spielrein family), John Launer's Sex Versus Survival: The Life and Ideas of Sabina Spielrein, published in 2014, is considered a more intimate take on her life, and focuses on Launer's interpretation and close readings of Spielrein's hospital notes, diaries, and correspondence. It calls into question many of the received accounts about Spielrein. Launer challenges the presumption that Jung psychoanalyzed Spielrein in any systematic way, reciprocated her feelings for long, saw her as his 'anima', or regarded her as a more significant figure than his other female partners of the time. Instead, Launer sees her historical importance as someone who made an early attempt to harmonize psychoanalysis and developmental psychology within an overarching biological framework, anticipating modern ideas from attachment theory and evolutionary psychology.

== In popular culture ==
- A BBC Radio play 'In a Strange Country' by Carolyn James, based on the letters of Freud and Jung and the diaries of Sabina Spielrein was broadcast in 2001 BBC genome
- A documentary, Ich hieß Sabina Spielrein (My Name Was Sabina Spielrein), was made in 2002 by the Hungarian-born Swedish director Elisabeth Marton and was released in the United States in late 2005. The documentary was released in the U.S. by Facets Video, a subsidiary of Facets Multi-Media.
- A 2002 biopic The Soul Keeper (Prendimi l'Anima), directed by Roberto Faenza, with Emilia Fox as Spielrein and Iain Glen as Carl Gustav Jung.
- Spielrein figures prominently in two contemporary British plays: Sabina (1998) by Snoo Wilson and The Talking Cure (2003) by Christopher Hampton (based on John Kerr's book A Most Dangerous Method) in which Ralph Fiennes played Jung, and Jodhi May played Spielrein. Both plays were preceded by the Off Broadway production of Sabina (1996) by Willy Holtzman.
- Hampton adapted his own play for a feature film called A Dangerous Method (2011), produced by Jeremy Thomas, directed by David Cronenberg, and starring Keira Knightley as Spielrein, Michael Fassbender as Jung and Viggo Mortensen as Freud.

== Conferences ==
In 2021, the International Association for Spielrein Studies organized the webinar "Sabina Spielrein: History and Contemporary Relevance". In 2022, it organized an international conference, "Sabina Spielrein and Early Female Pioneers of Psychoanalysis".

== Works ==
- A complete bibliography of all Spielrein's published writings (including details of English translations) is available at the website of the International Association for Spielrein Studies.
- Spielrein's papers in German from "major journals". Imago, International Journal of Psychoanalysis, Jahrbuch für Psychoanalytische und Psychopathologische Forschungen, Zeitschrift für Psychoanalytische Pädagogik and Zentralblatt. are available online at Collection of the International Psychoanalytic University, Berlin. (COTIPUB)
- Spielrein, Sabina (1912). "Die Destruktion als Ursache des Werdens". Jahrbuch für Psychoanalytische und Psychopathologische Forschungen (in German). IV: 465–503.

English translations:
1) Spielrein, Sabina (April 1994). "Destruction as the Cause of Coming Into Being" (PDF). Journal of Analytical Psychology. 39 (2): 155–186. doi:10.1111/j.1465-5922.1994.00155.x. Archived from the original (PDF) on 2016-03-04.
2) Spielrein, Sabina (1995). "Destruction as Cause of Becoming" (PDF). Psychoanalysis and Contemporary Thought. 18. Translated by Stuart K. Witt: 85–118. Archived from the original (PDF) on 2020-02-15. (Abstract)
3) Spielrein, Sabina (2015) [2003]. "11. Destruction as the Cause of Coming Into Being (pp. 185—212)". In Covington, Coline; Wharton, Barbara (eds.). Sabina Spielrein. Forgotten Pioneer of Psychoanalysis, Revised Edition (2nd, illustrated, revised ed.). Abingdon-on-Thames: Routledge. doi:10.4324/9781315700359. ISBN 978-1-31745860-9.
4) Spielrein, Sabina (2023). The untold story of Sabina Spielrein: healed & haunted by love: unpublished Russian diaries and letters. Translated by Lothane, Henry Zvi. New York: The Unconscious in Translation. ISBN 9781942254201.

- (in German) Spielrein, Sabina. Sämtliche Schriften. Giessen: Psychosozial-Verlag, 2008. (All of Spielrein's writings. In German. No English language edition.)

== See also ==
- Jungfrauen
- Toni Wolff
- Victor Ovcharenko – the Russian scientist who first introduced Sabina Spielrein's biography to the public in post-Soviet times
