= Toni Wolff =

Swiss psychologist (1888–1953)

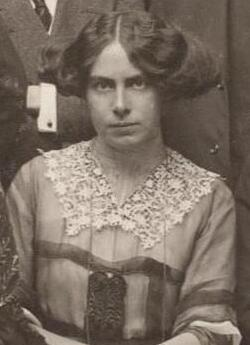
- Wolff c. 1911 (age 23)
- Born: Toni Anna Wolff; 18 September 1888; Zürich, Switzerland
- Died: 21 March 1953 (aged 64); Zürich, Switzerland
- Citizenship: Swiss
- Known for: Analytical psychology
- Scientific career
- Fields: Psychology, psychotherapy, Analytical psychology
- Workplaces: Psychologischer Club Zürich

Toni Anna Wolff (18 September 1888 – 21 March 1953) was a Swiss Jungian analyst and a close collaborator of Carl Jung. During her analytic career Wolff published relatively little under her own name, but she helped Jung identify, define, and name some of his best-known concepts, including anima, animus, and persona, as well as the theory of the psychological types. Her best-known paper is an essay on four "types" or aspects of the feminine psyche: the Amazon, the Mother, the Hetaira, and the Medial (or mediumistic) Woman. These four types exist on a quadrant chart with four dimensions. In this chart, the Mother is the opposite of the Hetaira on a vertical line, and the Medial woman is opposite the Amazon on a horizontal line.

== Biography ==
Wolff was born in 1888, the eldest of three daughters of a wealthy Zurich family. After being encouraged by her parents to pursue creative interests, Wolff developed a passion for philosophy and mythology, as well as for astrology. Despite being interested in higher education, her father denied her request at university, explaining that it was not appropriate for a young woman of her class to have an "official" education. However, Wolff pursued her studies by enrolling in classes as a non-matriculating student.

In December 1909, when Wolff was 21, her father died, and she became acutely depressed. She entered analysis with Jung on 20 September 1910, and almost immediately Jung was impressed by her intellect. Irene Champernowne, who knew both Wolff and Jung, testifies that Wolff possessed "remarkable insight and was articulate and confident." Jung treated her depression by stimulating and encouraging her to use her mind. She became one of "a long line of women who gravitated to Jung because he allowed them to use their intellectual interests and abilities in the service of analytical psychology". Wolff assisted Jung with psychology-related research and accompanied him, along with his wife, Emma, and a group of other colleagues, to a psychoanalytic conference in Weimar, Germany, in 1911. At that time Jung described Wolff in a letter to Freud as "a new discovery of mine, Frl. Antonia Wolff, a remarkable intellect with excellent feeling for religion and philosophy". Jung discharged Wolff from his analytic care around the end of 1911, despite his growing feeling of "being involved with her".

Wolff's connection and experience working with Jung was pivotal in her development as an analyst and member of the early analytical psychology circle in Zurich. She became a highly regarded analyst, second in renown only to Jung within the early Jungian community. Many considered her therapeutic skills to be superior to Jung's, as Tina Keller-Jenny attests: "I think of her work as an 'art.' She was a most gifted therapist. I told Dr. Jung he could never have helped me as Toni Wolff did." Irene Champernowne concurs: "I always felt as if I were even nearer to Jung's inner wisdom when I was with her than when I was with him in the flesh. She was . . . the inner companion of his journey through the unconscious."

In addition, after being the first woman elected to the executive committee of the Psychologischer Club Zürich, Wolff was elected president of the club, serving in that office for a total of 21 years. Prior to the publication of Jung's Collected Works, she acted as a senior editor for Jung's papers, collating and preparing them for wider dissemination. Beyond her signature essay on the four feminine structural forms, she wrote several other papers, most of them geared toward educating the growing number of students who came to Zurich to learn about the field of analytical psychology. When the C. G. Jung Institute of Zurich opened in 1948, Wolff taught training seminars for the analytical candidates.

In her later years, Wolff had severe arthritis, possibly stemming from her volunteer military service in neutral Switzerland during World War II. She also smoked all of her life, which took its toll on her health. Wolff died suddenly on 21 March 1953, of unknown causes, possibly a heart attack, at the age of 64. Her final resting place is in Zurich's Enzenbühl cemetery.

== Relationship with Jung ==
About a year after terminating Wolff's analysis, Jung had several dreams that indicated to him a need to reestablish their relationship; finally, he wrote to her in 1913. She became his primary intellectual collaborator. At the same time, their relationship became increasingly intimate. The intensity of Jung's relationship with Wolff initially caused tensions in his marriage, but eventually an understanding of sorts was reached, as it became abundantly clear that Jung would not give up either his wife or Toni, whom he called his "second wife". He had been looking for an "Anima woman", and Wolff fit the role well. She was a frequent visitor to the Jung family home, occasionally working with C. G. on projects in his home office from late morning until the family lunch (from which she was excluded), and then continuing in the afternoon. Wolff usually joined the family for Sunday noonday dinners. In 1916, she, Jung, and Emma, attended the opening of the Psychology Club of Zurich. Jung was commonly accompanied by both Wolff and his wife at public and private functions. This arrangement satisfied what Jung had termed "my polygamous components", and fit into his lifelong habit of distributing his affections for safety among a number of his so-called Jungfrauen. However, some interpreters claim that the marital arrangement undercut Toni's and Emma's self-esteem and caused both an enormous amount of pain. Wolff and Jung spent much of their private time at Bollingen Tower, the personal retreat house that Jung built in the early 1920s.

During the period of Jung's intense introspection that began in late 1913 – the time when he began composing his Red Book: Liber Novus — Wolff was a crucial figure in his life. A close acquaintance of both, Laurens van der Post, stated: "In this unfamiliar terrifying underground of the collective unconscious, she was Jung's guide . . . and she took over the whole of the burden". It was Wolff who listened to Jung's visions, dreams, and fantasies, serving as his sounding board as well as devil's advocate". Years later she recalled: "A few of us are forced to be instruments of the mind which seeks fuller consciousness". In his 1957 interviews with Aniela Jaffé, his secretary and biographer, Jung confirmed that he could talk with no one but Wolff during this period about his inner experiences. Jaffé later explained that Wolff was Jung's "helper in the intellectual penetration of the world of psychic images".

At one point during the process, Wolff became infected by Jung's visions and experienced the same psychic material that he was—a situation that Jung called "absolutely awful". In his theoretical writings, Jung describes such an occurrence as a "psychic infection". According to analyst Michael Fordham, it occurs when one individual guides another through especially treacherous psychic material. As Jung's guide, Wolff temporarily lost her bearings. But for most of the years between 1913 and 1917, she served as a source of insight and stability for Jung.

In the early 1930s, Jung began to study alchemy as a parallel to the process of individuation, but Wolff refused to accompany him in this new venture. Many believe that she refused because she felt Jung would be marginalized for investigating such an arcane subject, but Marie-Louise von Franz, who became Jung's main colleague in his research into the alchemical literature, claims it was Wolff's commitment to Christianity that caused her reticence to engage with Jung in this study. In her 2003 biography of Jung, Deirdre Bair quotes von Franz as saying that she intellectually replaced Toni Wolff in Jung's life. This can be confirmed from a documentary film in which von Franz said on camera:

Her [Wolff's] big mistake was in not being enthusiastic about alchemy. It was unfortunate that she refused to follow him there, because otherwise he would not have thrown her over to collaborate with me. He would have used me just for translating, and he would have confided in her. But she wasn't interested. She was too much a slightly conventional Christian, and she refused to follow him.

Despite Wolff's refusal to join Jung in the study of alchemy, she remained personally loyal to him for the remainder of her life and thoroughly committed to furthering the field of analytical psychology.

After his heart attack in 1944, Jung moved away from Wolff emotionally. She no longer carried his anima and no longer served as his special muse. Upon her death in 1953, Jung did not attend her memorial service. His associate Barbara Hannah cites his health, as well as his strong feelings of grief, as the primary reasons. Jung's wife attended Wolff's memorial on behalf of both of them. In memory of Wolff, Jung carved a memorial stone to honor her that read, in Chinese characters arranged vertically, "Toni Wolff Lotus Nun Mysterious". Just before his death, he told his close acquaintance, Laurens van der Post, that Wolff had supplied the "fragrance" of his life, while his wife, Emma, had supplied "the foundation".

== Publications ==
- Studien zu C. G. Jung's Psychologie (Zurich 1959, OCLC 6836153); trans. Essays of Analytical Psychology, Daimon-Verlag, 2025. ISBN 9783856306236
- Structural forms of the feminine psyche (Trans. P. Watzlawik; Zurich: CG Jung Institute 1956)

== See also ==
- Barbara Hannah
- Countertransference
- Jolande Jacobi
- Love triangle
- Sabina Spielrein

== Bibliography ==
- Healy, Nan Savage (2017). Toni Wolff & C. G. Jung: A Collaboration. Tiberius Press.
- Owens, Lance S. (2015). Jung in Love: The Mysterium in Liber Novus. Gnosis Archive Books, ISBN 978-0692578278
- Champernowne, Irene (1980). A Memoir of Toni Wolff. San Francisco Jung Institute (for free download see: https://web.archive.org/web/20130623101754/http://www.sfjung.org/about/other_institute_publications.asp).
- Jensen, Ferne (1983). C.G. Jung, Emma Jung and Toni Wolff: A Collection of Remembrances. Analytical Psychology Club.
- Kirsch, Thomas B. (2003). Toni Wolff-James Kirsch correspondence. Journal of Analytical Psychology 48 (4), pgs. 499–506.
- Neri, Nadia (1995). Oltre l'ombra. Donne intorno a Jung. Borla, Roma.
