= Man and His Symbols =

1964 book by Carl Jung, et al.

- Cover of the first edition
- Editor: Carl Jung
- Language: English
- Subjects: Psychoanalysis; symbolism
- Publication date: 1964
- Media type: Print (Hardcover and Paperback)
- ISBN: 0-385-05221-9

Man and His Symbols is the last work undertaken by Carl Jung before his death in 1961. First published in 1964, it is divided into five parts, four of which were written by associates of Jung: Marie-Louise von Franz, Joseph L. Henderson, Aniela Jaffé, and Jolande Jacobi. The book, which contains numerous illustrations, seeks to provide a clear explanation of Jung's complex theories for a wide non-specialist readership.

Jung wrote Part 1, "Approaching the Unconscious", of the book in English:

The last year of his life was devoted almost entirely to this book, and when he died in June 1961, his own section was complete (he finished it, in fact, only some 10 days before his final illness) and his colleagues' chapters had all been approved by him in draft. . . . The chapter that bears his name is his work and (apart from some fairly extensive editing to improve its intelligibility to the general reader) nobody else's. It was written, incidentally, in English. The remaining chapters were written by the various authors to Jung's direction and under his supervision.

== Origin of the book ==
The idea for this work developed in two stages.

In the spring of 1959, the BBC asked journalist and politician John Freeman to interview Carl Gustav Jung at his home in Küsnacht, Switzerland, for the television show Face to face. Forty minutes long, it was broadcast on 22 October 1959. Among those who saw it was Wolfgang Foges, who managed Aldus Books. He considered it a pity that at that time Jung remained very little known to the general public, especially compared to Sigmund Freud. He then begged Freeman to help him convince Jung to express the fundamentals of his thinking in the form of a popularization book.

Freeman returned to Jung's house but Jung then rejected the idea.

Two factors then came into play, which led Jung to finally accept the offer: the unusual abundance of mail he received as a result of the BBC show as well as a dream he had, in which he addressed a crowd listening attentively. When Foges asked Jung, a week later, he responded favorably but posed two conditions: that the book be written with some of his collaborators and that Freeman ensure its coordination.

== Structure of the book ==
Abundantly illustrated, the book consists of five parts:

- Exploration essay of the unconscious (Carl Jung)
- Primitive myths and modern man (Joseph L. Henderson)
- The process of individuation (Marie-Louise von Franz)
- Symbolism in the plastic arts (Aniela Jaffé)
- Symbols within an individual analysis (Jolande Jacobi)

Jung finished his chapter barely ten days before the onset of the illness that led to his death (this is his very last article) and after he had approved the draft of his collaborators.

After Jung's death, Marie-Louise von Franz assumed the responsibility of taking over the coordination and drafted the conclusion.

== Editions ==
A German-language edition of the book, Der Mensch und seine Symbole, has been published by Patmos Verlag. The illustrations included in this edition are in color.

The book was published in France at the same time as the original edition: in 1964.

The reissues remained unchanged, with the same pagination.

The book has been reprinted several times since initial publication, including:

- ISBN 0-385-05221-9 (Doubleday hardcover, 1964)
- ISBN 0-440-35183-9 (Dell Publishing paperback, 1968)
- ISBN 0-330-25321-2 (Picador paperback, 1978)
- ISBN 0-593-49999-9 (Bantam paperback, 2023)

== See also ==
- Twelve Dreams – 1981 play by James Lapine inspired by a case study contained in the book.
