= Memories, Dreams, Reflections =

1962 book by Carl Jung and Aniela Jaffé

- First edition (German)
- Author: Carl Jung and Aniela Jaffé
- Original title: Erinnerungen, Träume, Gedanken
- Translator: Richard and Clara Winston
- Language: German
- Subject: Autobiography
- Published: 1962 Exlibris (German); 1963 Pantheon Books (English)
- Media type: Print
- Pages: 447 (Fontana Press edition)
- ISBN: 0-00-654027-9 (Fontana Press edition)

Memories, Dreams, Reflections (German: Erinnerungen, Träume, Gedanken) is a partially autobiographical book by Swiss psychologist Carl Jung and an associate, Aniela Jaffé. First published in German in 1962, an English translation appeared in 1963.

The extensive original Protocols of the autobiography, initially omitted and censored, were edited by the Philemon Foundation. Princeton University Press finally announced their publication for December 2, 2025.

== Background ==
In 1956 Kurt Wolff, publisher and owner of Pantheon Books, expressed a desire to publish a biography of Jung's life. Dr. Jolande Jacobi, an associate of Jung, suggested that Aniela Jaffé be the biographer.

At first, Jung was reluctant to cooperate with Jaffé, but, because of his growing conviction of the work's importance, he became engrossed in the project and began writing some of the text himself. Jung wrote the first three chapters (about his childhood and early adulthood). In the introduction to the book Aniela Jaffé noted: "One morning he informed me that he wanted to set down his recollections of his childhood directly. By this time he had already told me a good many of his earliest memories, but there were still great gaps in the story. This decision was as gratifying as it was unexpected, for I knew how great a strain writing was for Jung. At his advanced age he would not undertake anything of the sort unless he felt it was a 'task' imposed on him from within." Some time afterwards she noted down a remark of Jung’s:

A book of mine is always a matter of fate. There is something unpredictable about the process of writing, and I cannot prescribe for myself any predetermined course. Thus this "autobiography" is now taking a direction quite different from what I had imagined at the beginning. It has become a necessity for me to write down my early memories. If I neglect to do so for a single day, unpleasant physical symptoms immediately follow. As soon as I set to work they vanish and my head feels perfectly clear.

Jung also contributed part of the chapter titled "Travels" (the part about his travels to Kenya and Uganda), and the chapter titled "Late Thoughts". The rest of the text was written by Jaffé in collaboration with Jung.

The content and layout of the book was much disputed. Jung's family, in the interest of keeping Jung's private life from the public eye, pushed for deletions and other changes. The publisher demanded that the text be greatly shortened to keep the price of printing down. Jaffé was accused of practicing censorship when she began to exercise her Jung-appointed authority to reword some of his thoughts on Christianity, which she deemed to be too controversial.

Eventually, the disputed text (including a chapter entitled "Encounters" detailing some of Jung's friendships and acquaintanceships) was integrated into other chapters. Pantheon Books dropped its demand for further deletions after protests from Jaffé and others.

The book was finally published in English by Pantheon Books, a division of Random House, in 1963, two years after Jung's death. It has remained in print ever since.

== Summary ==
Memories, Dreams, Reflections details Jung's childhood, his personal life, and his exploration of the psyche.

[W]here the interviewer and the interviewee confine themselves to the strictly personal picture of a rich life, the reader may perceive a wide panoramic vision of a devoted student of the humanities ...

== Reception ==
Historian Peter Gay comments in his Freud: A Life for Our Time (1988) that Memories, Dreams, Reflections is well-titled, given that it emphasizes dreams. Gay comments that, "Like many autobiographies, it is more revealing than the author meant it to be."

== Expanded edition ==
In December 2018, the Philemon Foundation announced the publication of the original protocols of Jung's autobiography.

The literary executor of the estate of Aniela Jaffé, Robert Hinshaw, and the Foundation of the Works of C. G. Jung have agreed to a complete publication of Aniela Jaffé’s protocols of Jung’s recollections. The volume will be edited by Sonu Shamdasani with Thomas Fischer and Robert Hinshaw as consulting editors, appearing in English in the Philemon Series of the Philemon Foundation, published by Princeton University Press. Completion of the edition by Philemon was initially planned for four years (2022), with a Princeton publication date of 2024–2025. On November 27, 2024, the foundation announced via social media Bluesky and X that Jung’s Life and Work: Interviews for Memories, Dreams, Reflections with Aniela Jaffé would be published in 2025 with an unconfirmed date. It would be edited by Sonu Shamdasani, with Thomas Fischer as consulting editor, and translated by Heather McCartney and John Peck. Finally, on March 18, 2025, Princeton announced its publication for December 2 of the same year.

== Bibliography ==
- C. G. Jung and Aniela Jaffé (2025). Jung's Life and Work: Interviews for Memories, Dreams, Reflections with Aniela Jaffé. Hardcover, 456 pages, includes unpublished material. Princeton University Press. ISBN 9780691193229.
- Jaffé, Aniela & Fischli, Elena (2021). Aniela Jaffé nach Gesprächen mit C.G. Jung. Streiflichter zu Leben und Denken C.G. Jungs (in German). Hardcover, 432 pages, includes unpublished material. Daimon Verlag. ISBN 978-3-85630-778-3. Reflections on the Life and Dreams of C.G. Jung by Aniela Jaffé from conversations from Jung. Historical Commentary by Elena Fischli. Hardcover, 408 pages. Daimon Verlag. 2023. ISBN 9783856307929. In dialogo con Carl Gustav Jung (in Italian). Paperback, 416 pages. Prologue Luigi Zoja. Bollati Boringhieri. 2023. ISBN 9788833941172.
