= John Peck (poet) =

American poet (born 1941)

- Born: John Frederick Peck; 1941 (age 84–85); Pittsburgh, Pennsylvania, U.S.
- Education: Stanford University (PhD)
- Occupations: Poet, Jungian analyst, editor, translator

John Frederick Peck (born 1941) is an American poet, Jungian analyst, editor and translator.

== As Poet ==
Peck was born in Pittsburgh, Pennsylvania in 1941. He earned a Ph.D. in English from Stanford University in 1973, where he studied with the poets and literary critics Yvor Winters and Donald Davie. Peck's dissertation, Pound's Idylls with Chapters on Catullus, Landor, and Browning, was supervised by Davie, and focused on the writing of the American modernist poet Ezra Pound. Peck's allusive, musically nuanced poetry shows clear traces of Pound, though Peck's ideas and metaphors tend to engage rather than insist. Peck writes primarily in free verse, though he does, in his words, “plait phonic elements across both accentual and syllabic grids,” a patterning of sound that he characterizes as having been more influenced by verse written by Pound's friend and contemporary Basil Bunting than by Pound.

The final chapter of literary critic Robert Archambeau's book Laureates and Heretics: Six Careers in American Poetry is devoted to Peck's life and work. Archambeau has praised Peck's non-pedantic erudition, describing Peck as “perhaps the most challenging—and one of the most rewarding—American poets of his generation.”

Peck's second collection of poems, The Broken Blockhouse Wall, received the Prix de Rome in 1978, and was followed by more than a decade of poetic silence (his next book of poems was not published for almost 15 years). Other honors include fellowships from the Guggenheim Foundation and the American Academy in Rome, an award from the American Academy and Institute of Arts and Letters, AGNI's Anne Sexton Poetry Award, and the first annual Thomas McGrath Prize in poetry. Peck was nominated for the Pulitzer Prize for Poetry in 2006.

He has held faculty positions at Princeton University, Mount Holyoke College, University of Zurich, Skidmore College, and the Massachusetts Institute of Technology (M.I.T.) and currently lives in Brunswick, Maine.

== As Jungian analyst and editor ==
Peck graduated from the C.G. Jung Institute in Zurich, Switzerland in 1992. Speaking to the relationship between his analytical work and his writing, Peck has said that “Jung’s psychology has deepened my respect for the gap between framing an intuition in words and actually taking in what the larger personality would have one incorporate.”

Along with Mark Kyburz, Peck was co-translator of Jung's The Red Book and Luigi Zoja’s Cultivating the Soul (2005). Peck also translated Zoja's Ethics and Analysis (2007), and Violence in History, Culture, and the Psyche (2009). Peck co-edited Dream Interpretation Ancient and Modern: Notes from the Seminar Given in 1936-1941, published by Princeton University Press in 2014, and is currently one of the main editors for the Philemon Foundation.

== Works ==
=== Poetry collections ===
- Shagbark (Bobbs-Merrill, 1972)
- The Broken Blockhouse Wall (David R. Godine, 1978)
- Poems and Translations of Hĭ-Lö (Sheep Meadow, 1991)
- Argura (Carcanet Press, 1993)
- Selva Morale (Carcanet Press, 1995)
- M and Other Poems (Triquarterly, 1996)
- Collected Shorter Poems (Triquarterly, 2004)
- Red Strawberry Leaf (University of Chicago, 2005)
- Contradance: Phoenix Poets (University of Chicago, 2011)
- I Came, I Saw: Eight Poems (Shearsman Books, 2012)
- Cantilena: One Book in Four Spans (Shearsman Books, 2016)

=== Translations ===
- The Red Book: Liber Novus (W. W. Norton & Company, Philemon Press, 2009)
