= Jungfrauen =

Group of trainee women analysts who were among Jung's first disciples

Jungfrauen ("Jung's women") was a satirical and scornful descriptive given by those on the outside of the supportive group of trainee women analysts (mainly based in Zurich) who were among the first disciples of Carl G. Jung. Some of these women were early popularizers of Jung's ideas. Even more unflattering were the terms maenads or valkyries.

== Members ==
After his wife, Emma, chief among the circle of women was Toni Wolff, followed by Jolande Jacobi, Marie-Louise von Franz, Barbara Hannah, Esther Harding, and his secretary, Aniela Jaffé. Other, more peripheral, figures were Kristine Mann and Hilde Kirsch.

== Meaning ==
In this context, the term is a pun, the German word jungfrauen means 'maiden' or 'unmarried woman', as the adjective jung means 'young' and the plural noun frauen means 'women'.

== Public image ==
Mary Bancroft (who was not a member of the group) described the Jungfrauen as "vestal virgins" hovering around Jung, their sacred flame. His secretary Aniela Jaffé, who was regarded as a member, said at an Eranos conference that they would throw off the stigma of the name Jungfrau and would hover around Jung like “bees around a honey-pot.”

It has been suggested that Jung's foreign travels in Africa were partly motivated by his desire to escape from the Jungfrauen.

== Later criticism ==
One former Jungian woman has criticized Jung's early women acolytes. Naomi R. Goldenberg, said that “Jungian psychology is a patriarchal religion within which I once lived and worked...[for] years in a Jungian universe”.

== Gallery ==
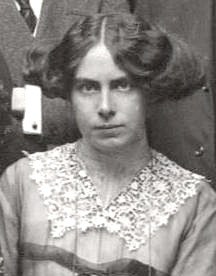
Toni Wolff

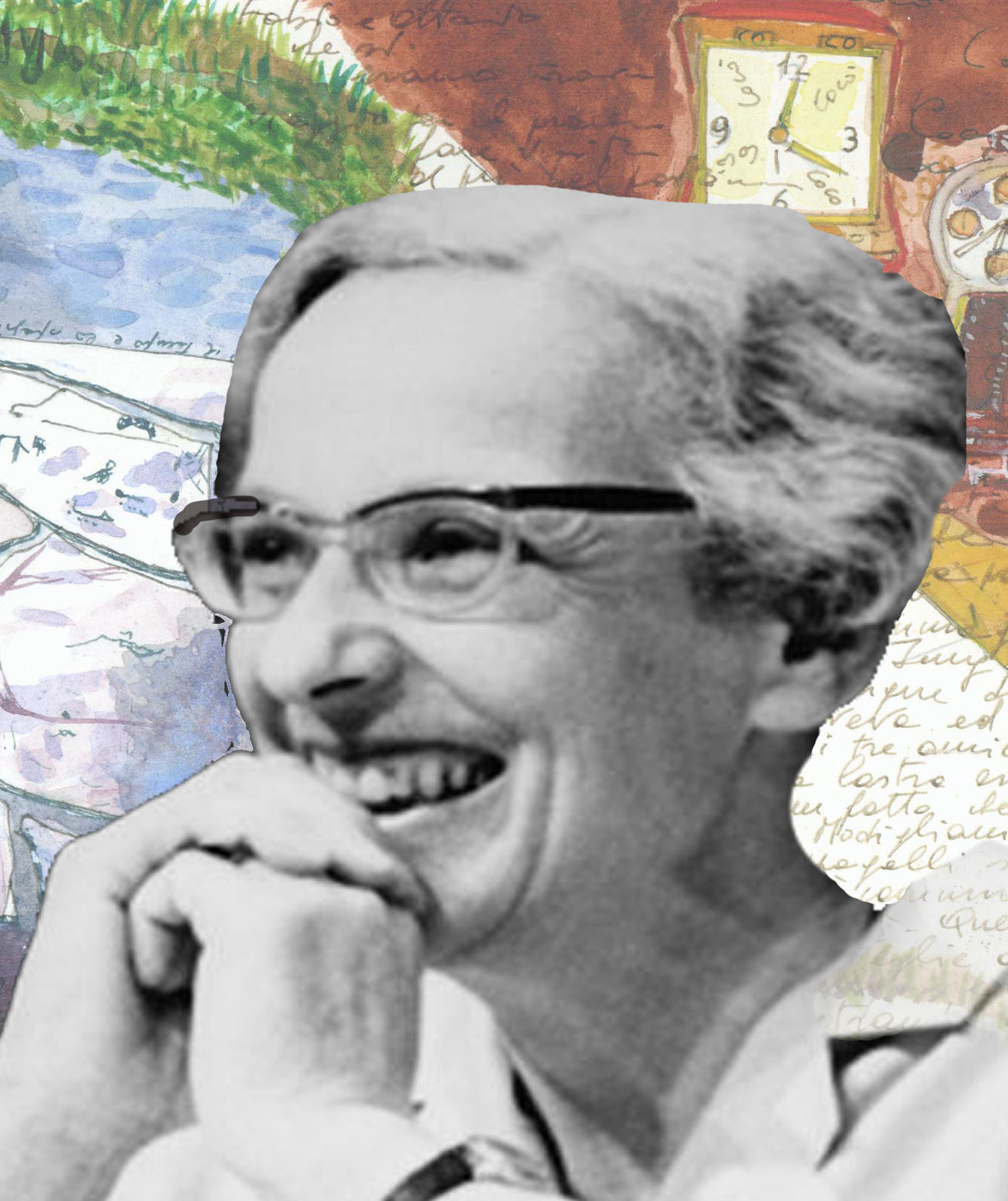
Marie-Louise von Franz

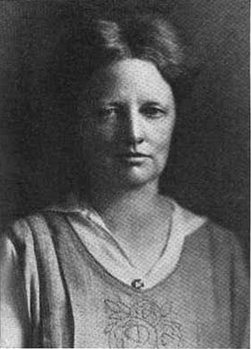
Kristine Mann

== See also ==
- Analytical psychology
- Carl Jung
- Psychoanalysis
- Sigmund Freud
- Zurich school
