= Ean Begg =

British Jungian psychologist

Ean Cochrane Macinnes Begg (1929 – 1 October 2018) was a Jungian analyst, writer, translator and broadcaster.

== Career ==
Begg was educated at Cranleigh School and Jesus College, Oxford. After obtaining a Modern Languages degree and a spell as an officer in the British army, followed by an assortment of occupations, such as a wine merchant, headmaster and Dominican friar, Begg developed interests in comparative religion, Gnosis and Norse mythology. He went on to train as an analytical psychologist at the C.G. Jung Institute in Zürich. His dissertation was on The Lord of the Rings. On his return to England in the 1970s, he joined the Association of Jungian Analysts (AJA). However, when in 1982 he was elected chairman of the organisation, Gerhard Adler, one of its founders, objected so strongly that a split developed and Ean Begg with a number of colleagues left AJA and went on to form a new group. It was called the Independent Group of Analytical Psychologists (IGAP) which became home to Zürich analytical psychology graduates in the United Kingdom. Ean Begg was an esotericist. He had a private practice in South London and was a frequent lecturer until his death in 2018.

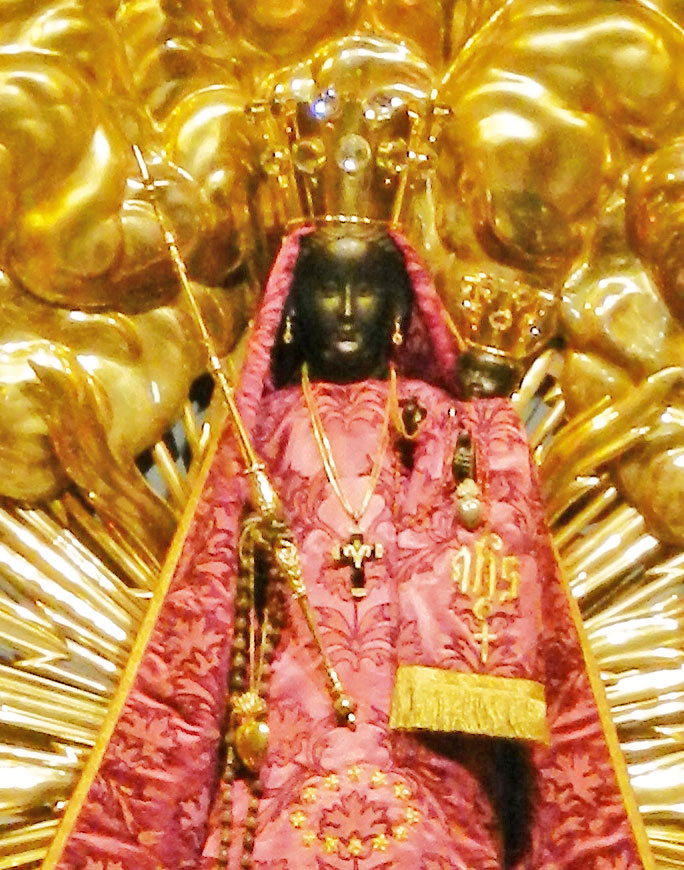
The Black Madonna of Einsiedeln

A near-fatal car crash in Switzerland led Begg to ponder his survival which he attributed to the nearby presence of the shrine of the Einsiedeln Madonna. It led to his study of the phenomenon of the "black madonna" which he published in 1985 and was translated into other languages and appeared in several subsequent editions.

Among Ean Begg's publications are:

- “Myth and Today's Consciousness”.
- “The Cult of the Black Virgin”
- “On the Trail of Merlin”
- “In Search of the Holy Grail and the Precious Blood”, co-authored with his second wife, Deike.

As a broadcaster, Begg compiled and presented and the BBC Radio 3 programme on C. G. Jung on the centenary of his birth. He subsequently edited and presented the 6-part BBC 2 TV series Is There Something After Death?.

Among Begg's other documentaries are:

- The Light of Experience Revisited, 1984
- Gambling with Hope, 1988
- Letting Go, 1988
