= Spielrein Mansion =

Coordinates: 47.2245°N 39.7106°E

The Spielrein Mansion
- Особняк Шпильрейн
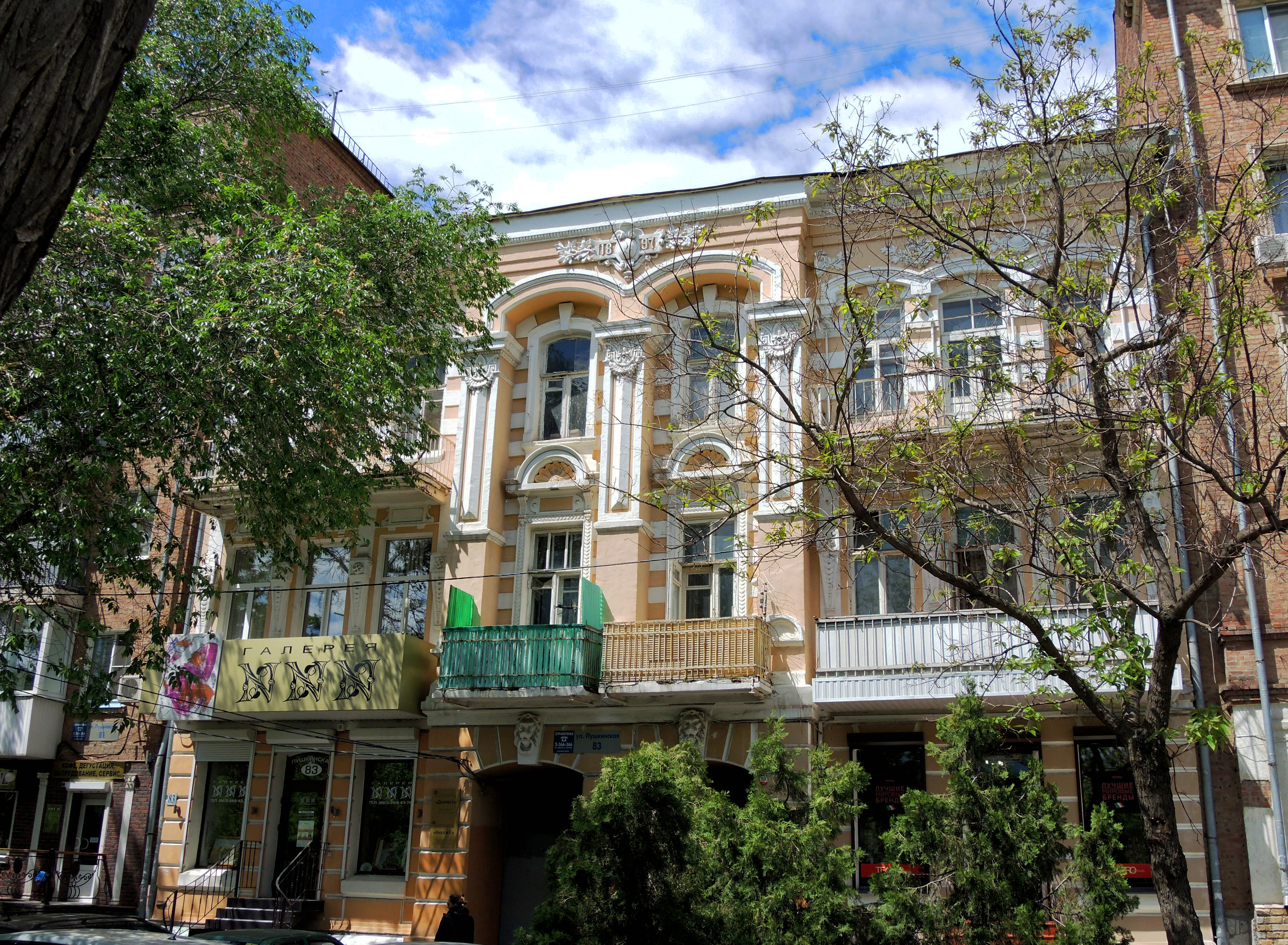
- Spielrein Mansion in 2015
- Interactive map of The Spielrein Mansion

General information
- Status: An object of cultural heritage of regional significance
- Location: 83 Pushkinskaya Street, Rostov-on-Don, Russia
- Opened: 1897

The Spielrein Mansion (Russian: Особняк Шпильрейн) is a house located at 83 Pushkinskaya Street in Rostov-on-Don. It has the status of an object of cultural heritage of regional significance.

== History ==
The mansion was built in 1897, and belonged to the dentist Eva Markovna Spielrein (1863-1922). She lived in the house with her husband and children, with the building also housing her dentist's office. Among Eva's children was her daughter, Sabina Nikolayevna Spielrein, who became a noted psychoanalyst. Sabina spent her childhood here.

As of 1914, the Belgian consulate was located in the Spielrein Mansion, and another of the apartments was rented by the Turkish consul. Other tenants were attorneys, engineers, and merchants. After the establishment of Soviet power the mansion was nationalized. Eva Spielrein and her children immigrated. Her husband was allowed to live in a small room underneath the front stairs where he lived until his death.

The mansion was damaged during the Second World War, with the roof being partially destroyed. The mansion was reconstructed and inhabited immediately after the war. In November 2015, the Sabine Spielrein Memorial Museum was opened in the mansion. The museum exhibitions include personal belongings and photographs.

== Architecture ==
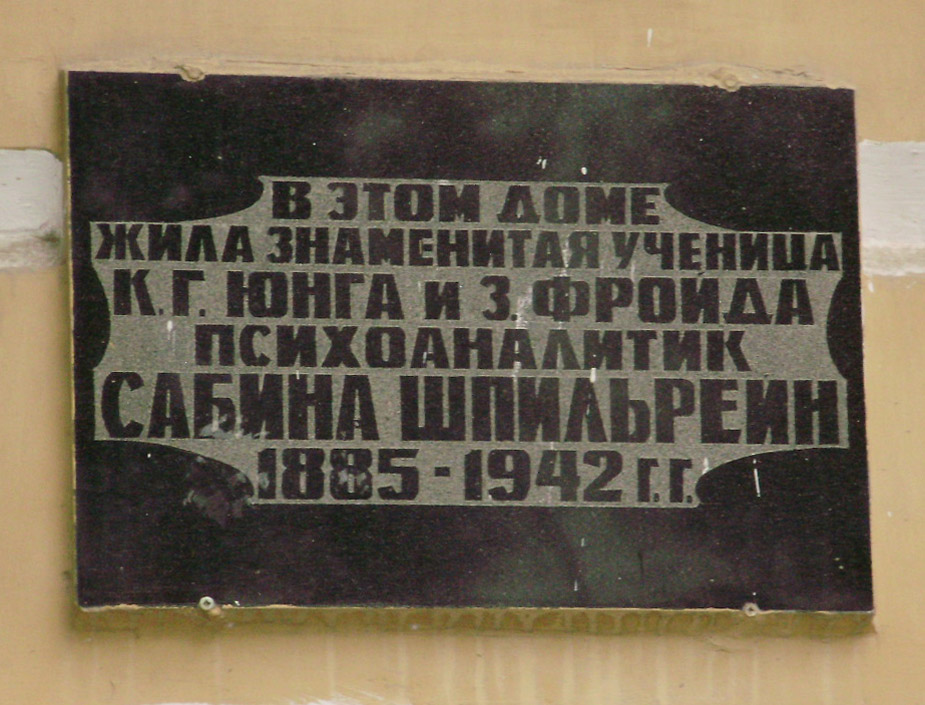
Memorial plaque to Sabina Spielrein on the building's facade

The three-storey building has a U-shaped plan configuration. In the inner wings of the building, facing the courtyard, there were originally living quarters that were rented out.

The architect organically combined elements of Renaissance, Baroque and Classicism in decoration of the façade. The central part of the front façade is accentuated with two-tiered loggia decorated with pilasters on the sides. Lesenes set on the lateral sides of the façade are decorated with Eastern ornaments. The first floor is rusticated. There is an arch at the front door and an arch at the entry to the courtyard – they both are decorated with keystones with lion masks. Cartouches are placed on the entablature of the facade, on the central one is the year the house was built - 1897.

== Plaques ==
In 2002 a commemorative plaque made by the Rostov-on-Don sculptor B. N. Kondakov was installed on the building's façade. It reads: "The famous student of K. G. Jung and S. Freud, psychoanalyst Sabina Spielrein (1885-1942), lived in this house»
