= Aniela Jaffé =

German psychoanalyst (1903–1991)

- Born: 20 February 1903; Berlin
- Died: 30 October 1991 (aged 88); Zurich
- Academic career
- Institutions: C. G. Jung Institute (1947–1955); Carl Jung (1955–1961)

Aniela Jaffé (February 20, 1903 – October 30, 1991) was a Swiss analyst who for many years was a co-worker of Carl Gustav Jung. She was the recorder and editor of Jung's semi-autobiographical book Memories, Dreams, Reflections.

== Life ==
Jaffé was born on 20 February 1903 to Jewish parents in Berlin, Germany, where she studied psychology at Hamburg, before fleeing the Nazis in the thirties to Switzerland. There she was analysed first by Liliane Frey and then by Jung, eventually becoming a Jungian analyst herself.

From 1947 to 1955 she served as secretary to the C. G. Jung Institute in Zurich, before working as Jung's personal secretary from 1955 to 1961. She continued to provide analyses and dream interpretations into her eighties.

== Controversy: Jung's autobiography ==
Controversy has developed over how responsible Jaffé actually was for Jung's late publication Memories, Dreams, Reflections. Current thinking would suggest that only the first three chapters of the published work were in fact written by Jung, the remainder being the work of Jaffé herself, if based on her notes of conversations with Jung.

On November 27, 2024, the Philemon Foundation announced via social media Bluesky and X that Jung's Life and Work: Interviews for Memories, Dreams, Reflections with Aniela Jaffé would be published by Princeton University Press in 2025 with no confirmed date. It would be edited by Sonu Shamdasani, with Thomas Fischer as consulting editor, and translated by Heather McCartney and John Peck. Finally, on March 18, 2025, Princeton announced its publication for December 2 of the same year.

== Symbolism and parapsychology ==
Jaffé wrote on symbolism in modern art, and explored parapsychological phenomena using Jung's concept of synchronicity as an interpretative tool.

== Works ==
=== English translation ===
- 'C. G. Jung and Parapsychology', in J. R. Smythies ed., Science and ESP (2013)
- The Myth of Meaning (1970)
- Parapsychology, Individuation, Nazism ISBN 3-85630-019-8
- From the Life and Work of C. G. Jung (1971)
- Apparitions and Precognitions (1971)
- C. G. Jung (1979)
- C. G. Jung Word And Image (1979)
- C. G. Jung Memories, Dreams, Reflections, New York: Vintage Books,1961)
- Was C. G Jung A Mystic And Other Essays (1989)

=== German ===
- Aus C.G. Jungs letzten Jahren und andere Aufsätze (bisher erschienen unter dem Titel: 'Aufsätze zur Psychologie C.G. Jungs', 1981), 2. Auflage 1987 Daimon Verlag, ISBN 978-3-85630-009-8
- Bilder und Symbole aus E.T.A. Hoffmanns Märchen "Der goldne Topf", 1. Auflage 1978 Gerstenberg Verlag, 5. Auflage 2010, Daimon Verlag, ISBN 978-3-85630-738-7
- C.G. Jung, Bild und Wort,1. Auflage 1977 Walter Verlag
- C.G. Jung, Briefe (Band I-III), 1. Auflage 1993 Patmos Verlag
- Der Mythus vom Sinn im Werk von C.G. Jung, 1. Auflage 1983, 4. Auflage 2010, Daimon Verlag, ISBN 978-3-85630-737-0
- Erinnerungen Träume und Gedanken von C.G. Jung, 1. Auflage Rascher Verlag 1969, 18. Auflage (korrigierte Sonderausgabe) 2013 Patmos Verlag, ISBN 978-3-8436-0191-7
- Geistererscheinungen und Vorzeichen, 1. Auflage 1995, 4. Auflage 2008, Daimon Verlag, ISBN 978-3-85630-716-5
- Mystik und Grenzen der Erkenntnis, 1. Auflage 1988 Daimon Verlag, ISBN 978-385630-033-3
- Parapsychologie Individuation Nationalsozialismus Themen bei C.G. Jung, 1. Auflage 1985, Daimon Verlag, ISBN 978-3-85630-019-7
- Religiöser Wahn und schwarze Magie, d. trag. Leben d. Anna Kingsford (1846 - 1888). Neugestaltung d. 1980 im Bonz-Verl. erschienenen Bd. "Anna Kingsford, religiöser Wahn und Magie". Zürich: Daimon-Verl., 1986. ISBN 3-85630-024-4.

== Bibliography ==
- C. G. Jung and Aniela Jaffé (2025). Jung's Life and Work: Interviews for Memories, Dreams, Reflections with Aniela Jaffé. Hardcover, 456 pages, includes unpublished material. Princeton University Press. ISBN 9780691193229.
- Jaffé, Aniela & Fischli, Elena (2021). Aniela Jaffé nach Gesprächen mit C.G. Jung. Streiflichter zu Leben und Denken C.G. Jungs (in German). Hardcover, 432 pages, includes unpublished material. Daimon Verlag. ISBN 978-3-85630-778-3. Reflections on the Life and Dreams of C.G. Jung by Aniela Jaffé from conversations from Jung. Historical Commentary by Elena Fischli. Hardcover, 408 pages. Daimon Verlag. 2023. ISBN 9783856307929. In dialogo con Carl Gustav Jung (in Italian). Paperback, 416 pages. Prologue Luigi Zoja. Bollati Boringhieri. 2023. ISBN 9788833941172.

== See also ==
- Jolande Jacobi
- Marie-Louise von Franz
- Jungfrauen
