= Peter Birkhäuser =

Swiss poster artist, portraitist, and painter

- Born: 7 June 1911; Basel, Switzerland
- Died: 22 November 1976 (aged 65); Binningen, Switzerland
- Known for: Painting
- Notable work: The World's Wound
- Spouse: Sibylle Oeri
- Children: 2

Peter Birkhäuser (7 June 1911 – 22 November 1976) was a Swiss poster artist, portraitist, and visionary painter, noted for his paintings illustrating imagery from dreams in the context of analytical psychology.

== Life and work ==
The son of an oculist, Birkhäuser was born and raised in Basel. His mother died early and he was brought up by his father in a rationalistic, agnostic environment. He wanted to be a painter from an early age, and left grammar school to study at an art school under Basel artist Niklaus Stoecklin.

In his early career as an artist, he produced still-life and landscape paintings, ex libris plates, stamps, cartoons for the satirical magazine Nebelspalter, posters, and portraits. He met his future wife Sibylle Oeri in the early 30s, and they married in 1939.

One evening, while working in his studio, he was struck by the image of a moth fluttering against the window. He painted this image in 1944, and later interpreted it as symbolic of his own state of mind: the moth, representing his soul, was struggling against the glass to reach the light, representing consciousness. This image precipitated a crisis in his career, resulting in a period of stagnation and depression.

During this period, he encountered works of C.G. Jung, and began to analyze his dreams. He and his wife entered Jungian analysis with Marie-Louise von Franz. Over the next 35 years, he collected and worked on over 3,400 of his dreams, discussing them with von Franz and corresponding with Jung himself.

As he interpreted them, his dreams often reflected images of himself as stultified by artistic tradition, and urged him to break with his previous stylistic constraints. In 1956, he achieved an artistic breakthrough with his painting The World's Wound, the first of a long series of works painted directly from unconscious dream images.

His new works were not well received by the Swiss art community, and it took several years before they would achieve sufficient recognition to provide Birkhäuser and his wife with a satisfactory income. Most of the initial support for his new work came from a younger audience, largely based in the U.S.

In 1971, his wife of 32 years died, and he developed a serious lung complaint. Nevertheless, he produced a number of his most significant paintings in the last five years of his life.

Birkhäuser died in Binningen in 1976.

In 1980, a selection of his later works was published in the book Light from the Darkness: The Paintings of Peter Birkhäuser, edited and introduced by his daughter and son, Eva Wertanschlag and Kaspar Birkhäuser, with commentary on the paintings by Marie-Louise von Franz. In addition to his paintings, the book also includes a 1970 lecture by Birkhäuser titled "Analytical Psychology and the Problems of Art."

== Quotes ==
I experience a power within myself which is not the same as my conscious ego. It has forced me to adopt a path quite foreign to my conscious attitude, a path which totally contradicted my will and everything I considered important. Before I was able to obey this power, I first needed to be crushed and almost destroyed. I often felt it was a pity this process had taken so long, but now, looking back over thousands of dreams and the sacrifices of a long, hard development, I can see how valuable the experience has been.

— in conversation with Dean Franz, ca. 1975

This mysterious power has its own will and ends. It knows things that no human being could know. So I'm sure it would not be wrong to give it the name of God. It is after all greater than every human faculty. It is what we impute to God, to know the future, or to know what an individual should do in the decades ahead.

— in conversation with Dean Franz, ca. 1975
