= Lyceum No. 13 =

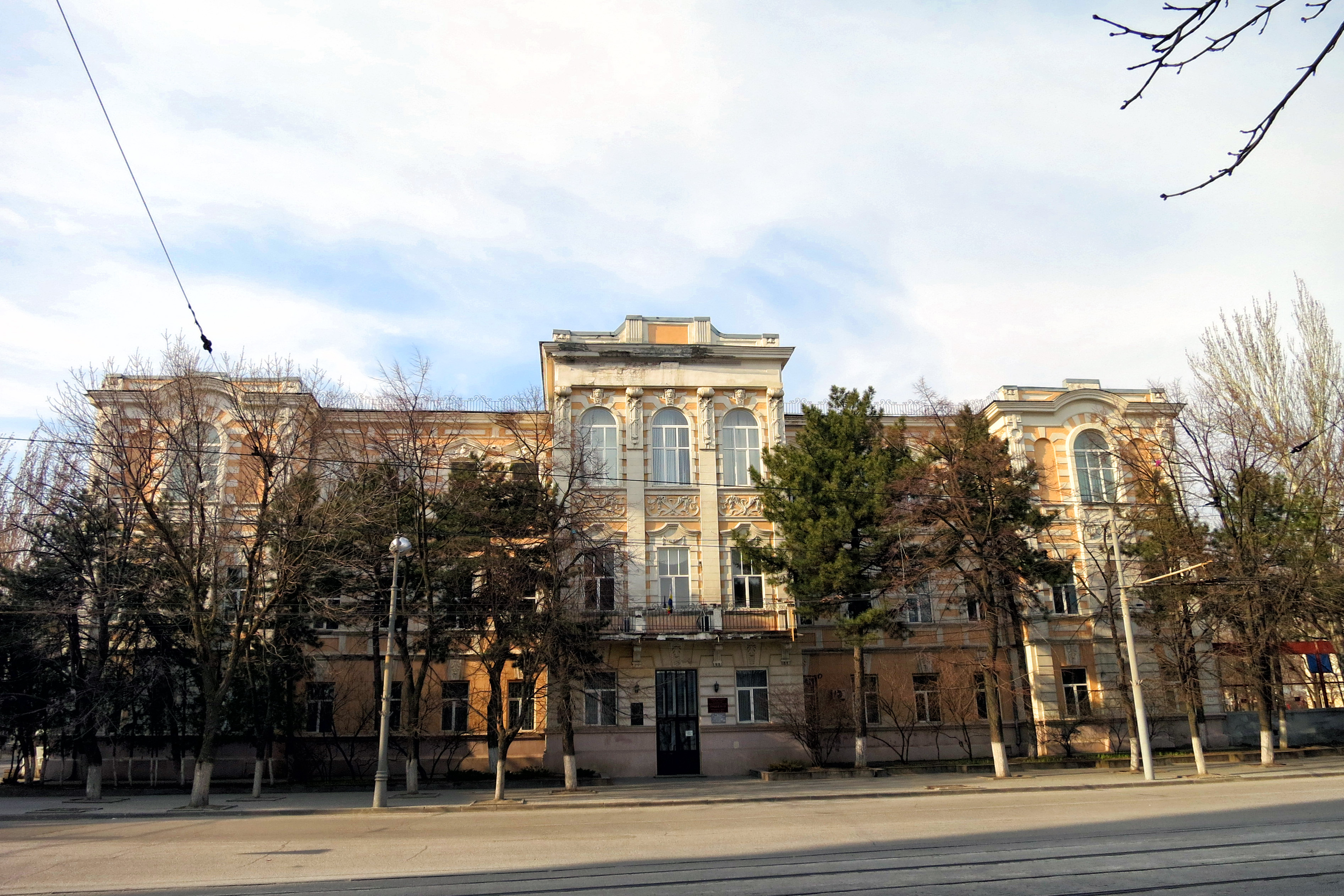
- Interactive map of Lyceum No. 13
- Location: Rostov-on-Don, Rostov Oblast, Russia
- Coordinates: 47°13′45″N 39°45′47″E

Lyceum № 13 (Russian: Лицей № 13) is a municipal general educational establishment in Rostov-on-Don. The school's building was designed in 1892 by the architect Nikolai Durbakh. It originally housed the Ekaterininskaya Women's Gymnasium of Nakhichevan-on-Don. The building has the status of an object of cultural heritage of regional significance.

== History ==
A female gymnasium was founded in Nakhichevan-on-Don in the late 19th century. It was named Ekaterininskaya in honour of Empress Catherine the Great, the city's founder. The building of gymnasium was designed in 1892 by Nakhichevan architect Nikolai Durbakh. Originally the building had two floors. Ekaterininskaya female gymnasium was an elite educational institution, teaching divine law, French, Russian, geography, history, handicrafts, and art. The original period of study was eight years; in 1910 it was increased to nine years. In 1921 the S. D. Markov First Soviet Labour School was opened in the building. In the 1930s it was renamed the Karl Marx School. Between 1943 and 1944, during the Second World War, the building housed a hospital, and was then used by military institutions until 1947. It was then repaired and in 1952 Lyceum № 13 was opened.

== Architecture and design ==
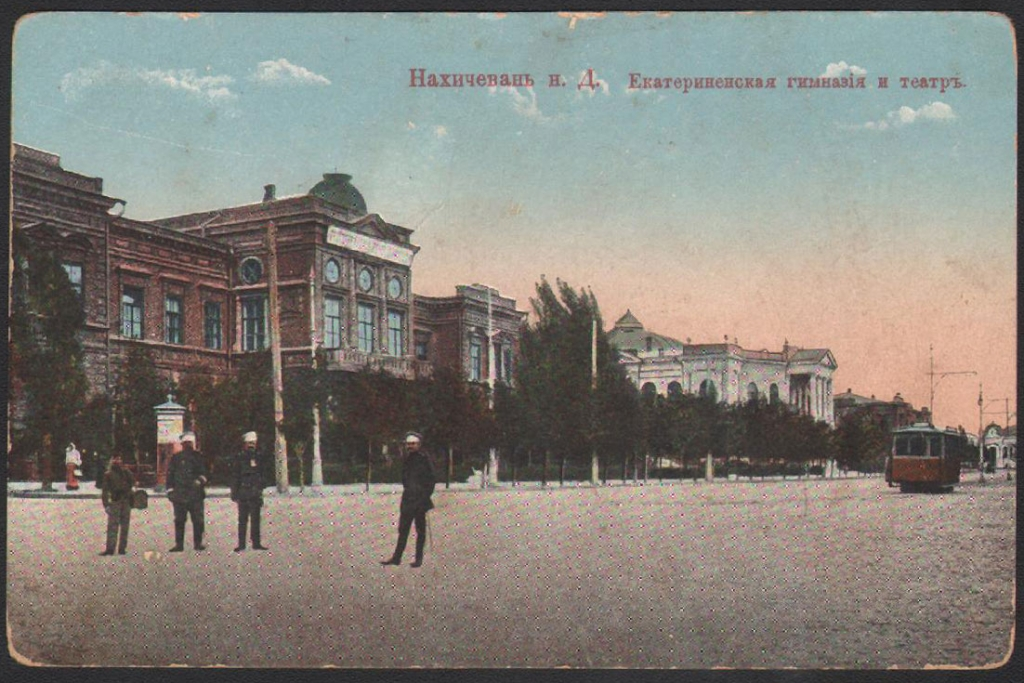
The gymnasium pictured in a pre-revolutionary postcard

The brick building has three floors and a pitched roof. The facades are finished with plaster. Three large projections protrude on the symmetrical main facade. The main entrance is located in the centre. The eastern and western facades are decorated with wall setbacks. The facades are designed with pilasters, stucco, heraldic inserts, wreaths, cartouches and medallions. The building has complex configuration. The grand staircase is situated in its central part. The classrooms and support space are situated on both sides of the central corridor. The assembly hall is located on the second floor.

== Notable students ==
- The writer Marietta Shaginyan studied in the gymnasium between 1902 and 1903. A commemorative plaque was placed on the school's facade in 1986: "In this building in 1902-1903 Marietta Sergeevna Shaginyan (1888-1982), the writer, Hero of the Socialist Labour, laureate of the Lenin and State Prizes studied in the female gymnasium".
- The historian and academic Militsa Nechkina was a student of the gymnasium between 1910 and 1914. She was a specialist on 19th century revolutionary movements, a researcher of the life and works of Alexander Griboyedov, and the author of popular books on the Decembrists, and history textbooks for secondary and high schools.
- Physician and psychoanalyst Sabina Spielrein studied here sometime between 1888 and 1904. After training as a paediatrician at the University of Zurich, she went on to work as a psychoanalyst and published over 35 papers in three languages on subjects such as the death instinct and child psychoanalysis.
