= Tatiana Rosenthal =

Russian neurologist and psychoanalyst (1885–1921)

Tatiana Rosenthal or Rozenthal (Russian: Татьяна Конрадовна Розенталь, romanized: Tatyana Kondarovna Rozental; 1885–1921) was a Russian psychoanalyst, physician and specialist in neurology.

== Life ==
Tatiana Rosenthal was born in St Petersburg in 1885. A supporter of the Russian Revolution of 1905, she then went to Switzerland, where she studied medicine at the University of Zurich. After gaining her medical diploma, she went to Vienna, where she was a member of Sigmund Freud's Wednesday Group in Vienna, the forerunner of the Vienna Psychoanalytic Society. In 1911 she published a paper on the Danish writer Karen Michaelis, 'The dangerous age of Karen Michaelis in light of psychoanalysis', which pioneered the use of psychoanalysis in literary criticism.

At the beginning of World War I, Rosenthal returned to St. Petersburg, where she worked as a neurologist at Vladimir Bekhterev’s Brain Institute. Bekhterev, though not himself converted to psychoanalysis, appointed Rosenthal as the head of the outpatient clinic, and allowed her to treat neurotic patients there with psychoanalysis. In that way, she became the founder of psychoanalysis in St Petersburg.

Interested in the psychology of art, Rosenthal published a 1920 paper which tried to explain Dostoevsky’s creative writing by his personal suffering.

While in St Petersburg, she had a child. In 1921 she committed suicide.

== Works ==
- 'Stradanie i tvortchestvo v Dostoïevskoni' [Suffering and creation in Dostoyevski], Voprosi psychologiu litschnosty, 1920
