= Barbara Hannah =

English psychologist

- Born: 2 August 1891; Brighton, England
- Died: 4 September 1986 (aged 95); Küsnacht, Switzerland
- Known for: association with Carl Gustav Jung
- Notable work: Jung: His Life and Work, A Biographical Memoir

Barbara Hannah was born in England. She is well known for her association with Carl Gustav Jung whom she joined in 1929 in Zurich and remained so until his death.

== Biography ==
Hannah began analysis with Jung in 1929. She befriended Joseph L. Henderson the same year, and shared accommodation with him in Zurich. In late 1974, she accepted Marion Woodman into analysis stating, "You are a parson's daughter; I am a parson's daughter...Jung told me that only a parson's child can handle a parson's child.'

Hannah became a close friend of Swiss Jungian psychologist Marie-Louise von Franz, to whom she was introduced by Jung. He encouraged the younger von Franz to live with her, stating that "the real reason you should live together is that your chief interest will be analysis and analysts should not live alone."

Hannah wrote a biography of Jung entitled Jung, His Life and Work: A Biographical Memoir. She also practised as a psychotherapist and served as lecturer at the C.G. Jung Institute.

== Major works ==
- The Animus: The Spirit of Inner Truth in Women, Volume 1 ISBN 978-1-888602-46-3
- The Animus: The Spirit of Inner Truth in Women, Volume 2 ISBN 978-1-888602-47-0
- The Archetypal Symbolism of Animals ISBN 978-1-888602-33-3
- Encounters with the Soul ISBN 978-1-888602-14-2
- Jung, His Life and Work: A Biographical Memoir ISBN 978-1888602074
- Striving Toward Wholeness ISBN 978-1-888602-13-5
