= Psychology Club Zürich =

Swiss psychological association

Coordinates: 47°22′0.9″N 8°33′0.9″E

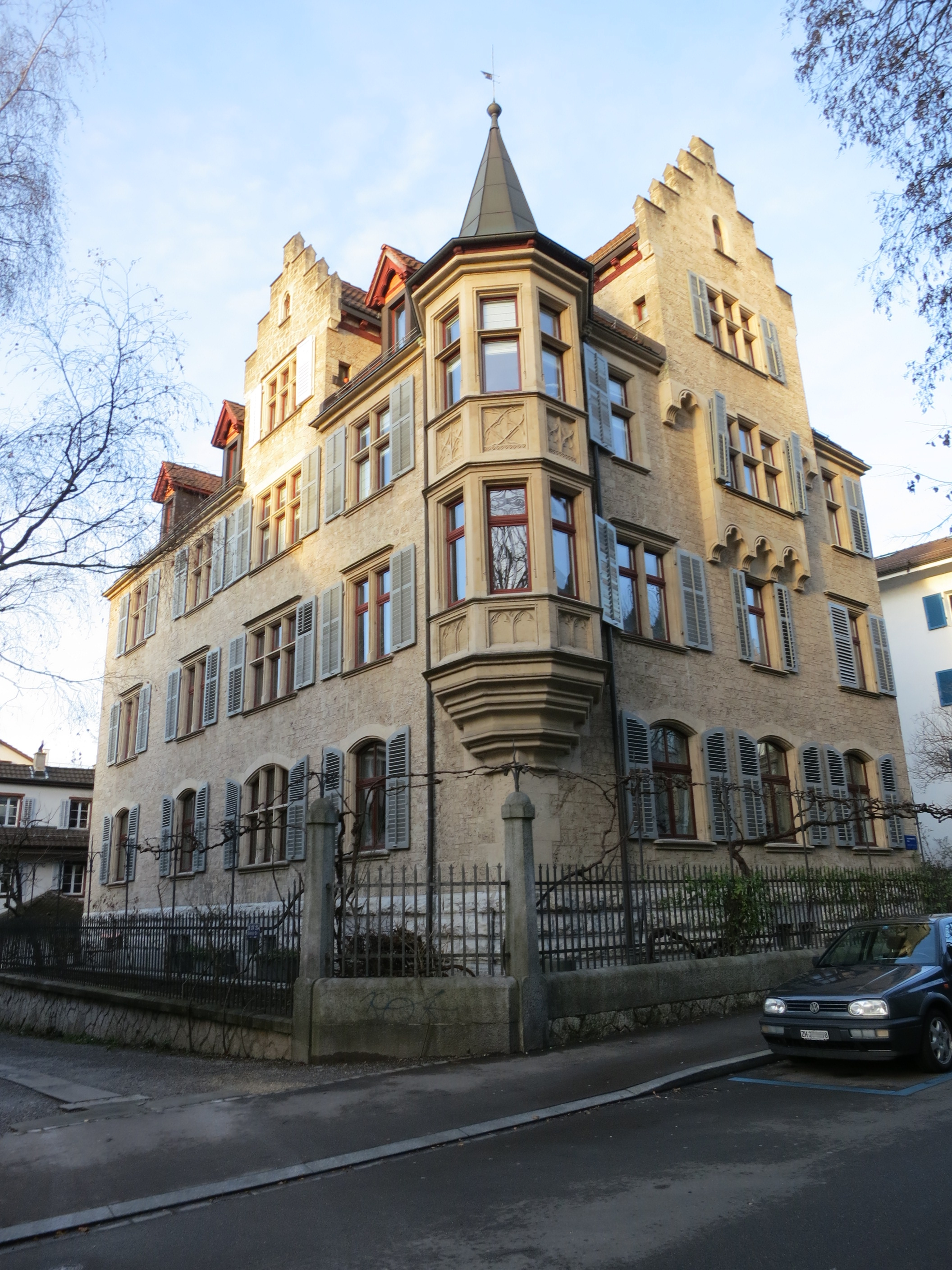
Psychology Club Zürich

The Psychology Club Zürich (German: Psychologischer Club Zürich) is an association founded in Küsnacht, Switzerland, in 1916 by Swiss psychiatrist and psychologist Carl Jung, his wife and former patients and students, to promote and develop analytical psychology. Located in a neo-Gothic building at Gemeindestrasse 27, Zürich, it became a prototype for other psychology clubs.

The club continues to play an important role in the global development of Jungian psychology. Its centenary was celebrated in 2016.

== See also ==
- C. G. Jung Institute, Zürich
