= Luigi Zoja =

Italian psychoanalyst and writer (born 1943)

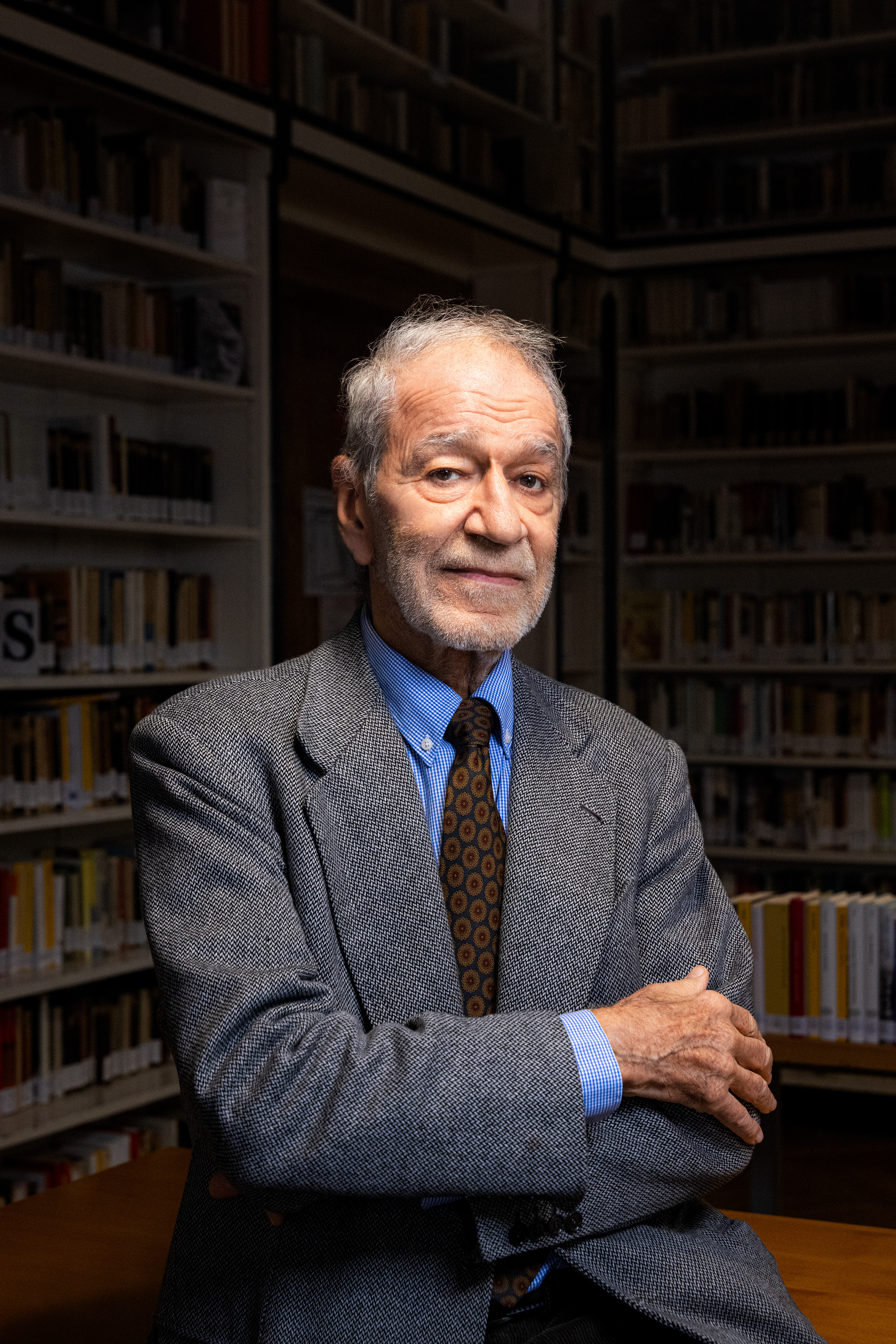
Zoja in 2024

Luigi Zoja (born August 19, 1943) is an Italian psychoanalyst and writer. He took a degree in economics and did research in sociology during the late 1960s. Soon thereafter he studied at the C. G. Jung Institute in Zurich. After taking his diploma, Zoja returned to Zurich to work at a clinic for several years. He maintains a private practice in Milan. He also practiced for two years in New York City, during a period that bracketed the terrorist attacks on New York and Washington, D. C. He has taught regularly at the Zurich Jung Institute, and also on occasion at the Universities of Palermo and Insubria. From 1984 to 1993, Zoja was president of CIPA (Centro Italiano di Psicologia Analitica), and from 1998 to 2001 was president of the IAAP (International Association of Analytical Psychology). Later he chaired the IAAP's International Ethics Committee. His essays and books have appeared in 14 languages.

Most of his essays interpret present-day predicaments (addiction, limitless consumption, the absence of the father, hatred and paranoid projections in politics, etc.) by placing them in the light of persistent ancient patterns, as expressed in myth and classical literature. Archetypal psychologist James Hillman has called Zoja an "anthropological psychologist" as one way of indicating the range and depth of his thinking.

== Books in Italian ==
- Problemi di psicologia analitica: una antologia post-junghiana. Napoli: Liguori 1983. ISBN 88-207-1168-0.
- Nascere non basta: iniziazione e tossicodipendenza. 1st ed. Milano: Raffaello Cortina Editore 1985. ISBN 88-7078-046-5. 2nd ed. Milano: Raffaello Cortina editore 2003. ISBN 88-7078-840-7.
- Crescita e colpa: psicologia e limiti dello sviluppo. Milano: Anabasi 1993. ISBN 88-417-5004-9.
- Coltivare l'anima Bergamo: Moretti & Vitali 1999. ISBN 88-7186-135-3.
- Il gesto di Ettore: preistoria, storia, attualità e scomparsa del padre. Torino: Bollati Boringhieri 2000. ISBN 88-339-1292-2. The book won the Premio Palmi award in 2001.
- L'incubo globale: prospettive junghiane a proposito dell'11 settembre James Hillman et al., ed. by Luigi Zoja. Torino: Bollati Boringhieri 2000. ISBN 88-339-1292-2.
- Storia dell'arroganza: psicologia e limiti dello sviluppo. Bergamo: Moretti & Vitali 2003. ISBN 88-7186-232-5.
- Giustizia e bellezza. Torino: Bollati Boringhieri 2007. ISBN 978-88-339-1760-3.
- La morte del prossimo. Torino: Giulio Einaudi editore 2009. ISBN 978-88-06-17781-2.
- Contro Ismene: considerazioni sulla violenza. Torino: Bollati Boringhieri 2009. ISBN 978-88-339-1988-1.
- Centauri: mito e violenza maschile. Roma-Bari: Casa editrice Giuseppe Laterza & figli 2010. ISBN 978-88-420-9391-6.
- Al di là delle intenzioni. Etica e analisi. Torino: Bollati Boringhieri 2011. ISBN 88-339-2145-X.
- Paranoia, La follia che fa la storia., Torino, Bollati Boringhieri, 2011. ISBN 978-88-339-2244-7.
- Utopie minimaliste Milano, Chiarelettere, 2013 ISBN 978-88-6190-355-5 Premio Nazionale Rhegium Julii Walter Mauro per la saggistica.
- Psiche, Torino, Bollati Boringhieri, 2015, ISBN 978-88-339-2640-7.
- Il gesto di Ettore. Preistoria, storia, attualità e scomparsa del padre, Nuova edizione rivista, aggiornata e ampliata, Torino, Bollati Boringhieri, 2016, ISBN 978-88-339-2717-6
- Centauri. Alle radici della violenza maschile, Nuova edizione rivista, aggiornata e ampliata, Torino, Bollati Boringhieri, 2016 ISBN 9788833928081
- Nella mente di un terrorista. Conversazione con Omar Bellicini, Torino, Einaudi, 2017, ISBN 8806235761
- Vedere il vero e il falso, Torino, Einaudi, 2018, ISBN 9788858429501
- Utopie minimaliste: ecologia profonda, psicologia e società, Milano, Chiarelettere, 2021, ISBN 9788832964080
- Dialoghi sul male. Tre storie, Torino, Bollati Boringhieri, 2022, ISBN 9788833937847
- Il declino del desiderio. Perché il mondo sta rinunciando al sesso, Torino, Einaudi, 2022 ISBN 9788806251734
- Paranoia. La follia che fa la storia, nuova edizione, Torino, Bollati Boringhieri, 2023 ISBN 9788833942117
- Narrare l'Italia. Dal vertice del mondo al Novecento, Torino, Bollati Boringhieri, 2024, ISBN 9788833940854. Finalista Premio Strega 2025.
- Il nostro tempo. Narrare un'Europa, Torino, Bollati Boringhieri, 2025, ISBN 9788833945378.

== Books in English ==
- Drugs, Addiction, and Initiation: The Modern Search for Ritual. 1st ed. Boston: Sigo, 1989; 2nd ed. Einsiedeln, CH: Daimon, 2000. ISBN 3-85630-595-5.
- Growth and Guilt: Psychology and the Limits of Development. London: Routledge, 1995. ISBN 0-415-11661-9.
- The Father: Historical, Psychological, and Cultural Perspectives. London & New York: Brunner-Routledge, 2001. ISBN 1-58391-107-3. [Gradiva Award, 2002]
- Jungian Reflections on September 11: A Global Nightmare. Eds. Luigi Zoja and Donald Williams. Einsiedeln, CH: Daimon, 2002. ISBN 3-85630-619-6.
- Cultivating the Soul. London: Free Association, 2005. ISBN 1-85343-758-1.
- Ethics and Analysis. College Station: Texas A & M University Press, 2007. ISBN 978-1-58544-578-3. [Gradiva Award, 2009]
- Violence in History, Culture, and the Psyche: Essays. New Orleans: Spring Journal Books, 2009. ISBN 978-1-882670-50-5.John Peck, "Zoja among Others: Between the Ego and a Hard Place," Afterword to Violence in History, Culture, and the Psyche: Essays (as above).
- Paranoia: The Madness that Makes History. London & New York: Routledge, 2017. ISBN 978-1138673540
- The Father: Historical, Psychological, and Cultural Perspectives. New York: Routledge, 2018. ISBN 978-1-138500914.

== See also ==
- Carl Jung
- Analytical Psychology
- James Hillman
