= C. G. Jung Institute, Zürich =

Swiss psychology organisation

Coordinates: 47°18′56″N 8°34′45″E

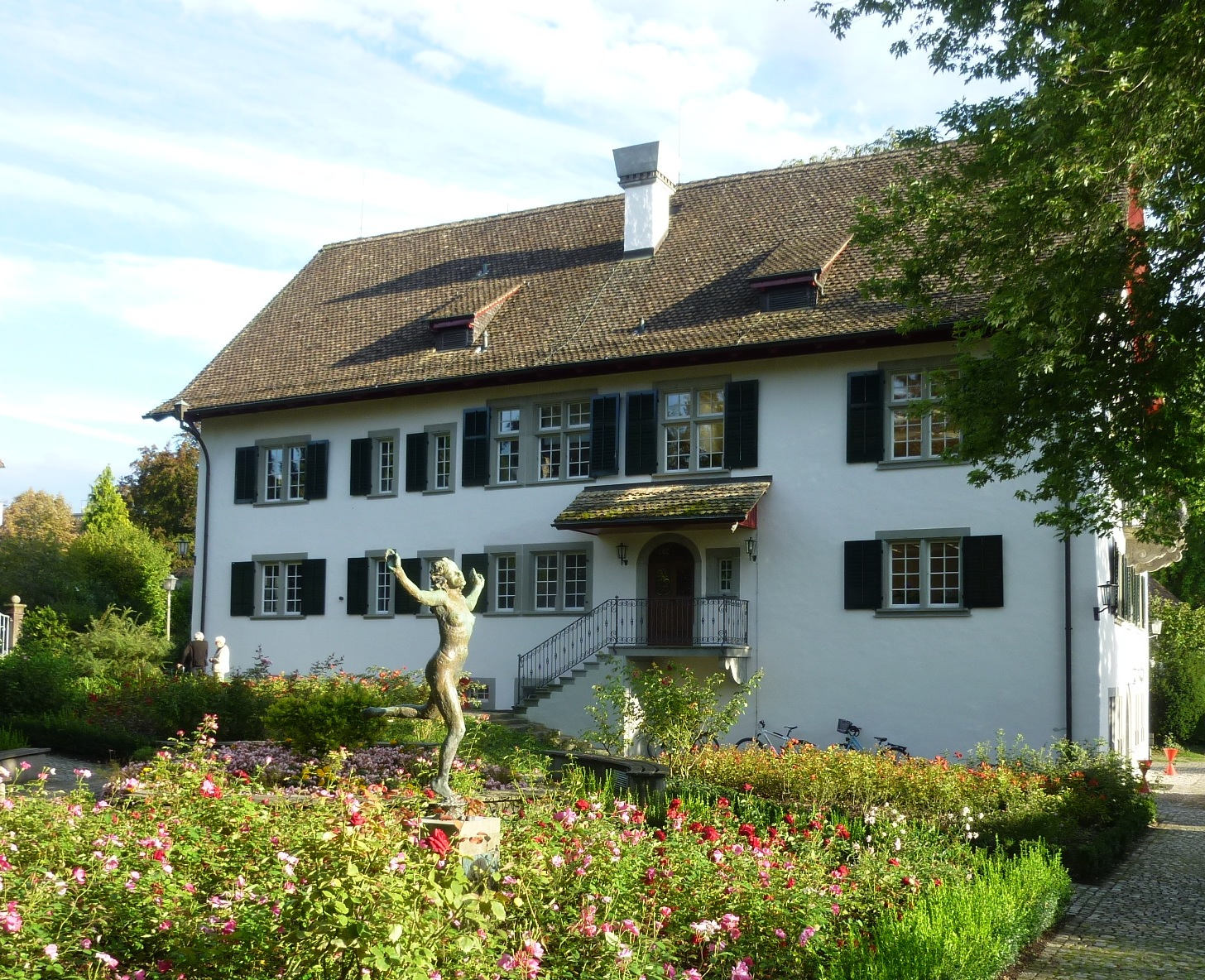
C. G. Jung-Institut Zürich in Küsnacht

The C. G. Jung Institute, Zürich (German: C. G. Jung-Institut Zürich) was founded in Zürich, Switzerland, in 1948 by the psychiatrist Carl Gustav Jung, the founder of analytical psychology (more commonly called Jungian psychology) (in 1979, it moved to its present location in Küsnacht, a few miles south of Zürich). Marie-Louise von Franz and Jolande Jacobi were also active in the foundation and early work of the institute.

The institute was founded in 1948 to provide training and conduct research in analytical psychology and psychotherapy. Jung led the institute until 1961, the year of his death. The library of the institute holds around 15,000 books and periodicals related to Jungian psychology.

Several other organizations named the C.G. Jung Institute exist around the world, e.g. in New York City, Los Angeles and Chicago.

== See also ==
- Psychology Club Zürich
