= Jolande Jacobi =

Swiss psychologist (1890–1973)

- Born: 25 March 1890; Budapest
- Died: 1 April 1973 (aged 83); Zurich

Academic background
- Education: University of Vienna

Academic work
- Discipline: Psychology
- Sub-discipline: Jungian psychology

Jolande Jacobi (25 March 1890 – 1 April 1973) was a Swiss psychologist, best remembered for her work with Carl Jung, and for her writings on Jungian psychology.

== Life and career ==
Born in Budapest, Hungary (then under Austria-Hungary) as Jolande Szekacs, she became known as Jolande Jacobi after her marriage at the age of nineteen to Andor Jacobi. She spent part of her life in Budapest (until 1919), part in Vienna (until 1938) and part in Zurich. Her parents were Jewish, but Jacobi converted first to the Reformed faith (in 1911), later in life to Roman Catholicism (in 1934). Jacobi met Jung in 1927, and later was influential in the establishment of the C.G. Jung Institute for Analytical Psychology in Zurich in 1948, where she was nicknamed 'The Locomotive' for her extraversion and administrative drive. Her students at the C.G. Jung Institute included Wallace Clift. She died in Zurich, leaving one new book (entitled: "The tree as a symbol") uncompleted.

== Writing ==
Jacobi's first publication was an outline of Jung's psychology in its classical form, an outline which was to be translated into fifteen languages and go through many successful editions. Jung himself would call her writings "a very good presentation of my concepts". Her subsequent books continued to offer clear expositions of central, classic Jungian themes.

== Controversy ==
In the sixties, Jacobi was involved in a controversy at the Zurich Institute involving the question of boundary violations with a patient on the part of the analyst James Hillman, something to which Jacobi took strong exception. The result was a firmer policy on, and greater explication of the need to avoid such violations at the institute.

== Criticism ==
Jacobi's exposition of Jungianism is open to criticism for over-simplification and reification of Jung's more amorphous concepts of the unconscious. Her belief that "The course of individuation exhibits a certain formal regularity...this absolute order of the unconscious" laid her open to the charge of an over-literal interpretation of Jung; while her diagrams of the psyche – one with the ego at the centre, one with it at the periphery – inevitably provided only one-dimensional snapshots of the richness of psychic experience.

== Works include ==
- Jacobi, J. 'The Process of Individuation' Journal of Analytical Psychology 111 (1958)
- Jacobi, J. 'Symbols in an Individual Analysis', in C. G. Jung ed, Man and his Symbols (1978 [1964]) Part 5
- Jacobi, J. (1942) The Psychology of C.G. Jung: An Introduction
- Jacobi, J. (1959) Complex, archetype and symbol in the psychology of C.G. Jung (translated by R. Mannheim). New York: Princeton.
- Jacobi, J., Masks of the Soul Translated by Ean Begg, William B. Eerdmans Publishing Company, 1977.
