= The Soul of Christmas: A Celtic Music Celebration =

Compilation album by: Thomas Moore; Liam Tiernan; Nikki Matheson; Susan McKeown; Cathie Ryan; Johnny Cunningham; Mary Fahl; Kathy Mattea
- Released: October 14, 1997
- Genre: Celtic; Christmas
- Length: 1:50:28
- Label: Tommy Boy Records
- Producer: Thomas Moore; Susan Piver; Johnny Cunningham

Professional ratings
Review scores
Source	Rating
AllMusic	3/5 stars

The Soul of Christmas: A Celtic Music Celebration is a 1997 compilation album produced by Thomas Moore that features various Celtic musicians, including Susan McKeown, Cathie Ryan, Johnny Cunningham, Mary Fahl, and Kathy Mattea. The 2-disc set includes traditional Christmas carols and Celtic-style arrangements of holiday songs, such as "I Saw Three Ships" and "We Three Kings". The album was released by Tommy Boy Records on October 14, 1997.

Upon its release, the album was accompanied by a PBS Pledge Week Christmas Special of the same name. Hosted by Martin Sheen, and featuring the albums primary vocalists, the special aired daily from December 6–14, 1997. The Soul of Christmas: A Celtic Music Celebration was subsequently released for purchase on VHS via GlobalVision.

== Track listing ==
Disc 1
No.	Title	Writer(s)	Artist	Length
1.	"God Rest Ye Merry, Gentlemen"	Traditional	Liam Tiernan	4:29
2.	"Jesus Christ the Apple Tree"	Richard Hutchins	Susan McKeown & Nikki Matheson	3:15
3.	"In dulci jubilo"	Henry Suso	Cathie Ryan & Liam Tiernan	2:14
4.	"We Three Kings"	John Henry Hopkins Jr.	Thomas Moore	4:17
5.	"Silent Night"	Franz Xaver Gruber	Liam Tiernan	4:35
6.	"It Came Upon the Midnight Clear"	Edmund Sears	Cathie Ryan	3:00
7.	"I Saw Three Ships"	Traditional	Johnny Cunningham	4:42
8.	"In the Bleak Midwinter"	Christina Rossetti	Liam Tiernan	6:02
9.	"Lo, How A Rose"	Michael Praetorius	Susan McKeown & Nikki Matheson	3:56
10.	"The Holly and the Ivy"	Traditional	Liam Tiernan	3:12
11.	"Lully, Lullay"	Traditional	Mary Fahl	2:29
12.	"Gloria in excelsis Deo"	Johann Sebastian Bach	Thomas Moore	3:45
13.	"Remember, O Thou Man"	Thomas Ravenscroft	Liam Tiernan	5:15
14.	"Christ Child's Lullaby"	Kathy Mattea	Kathy Mattea	4:29

Disc 2
No.	Title	Writer(s)	Artist	Length
1.	"Introduction"	Thomas Moore	Thomas Moore	2:26
2.	"Thomas Moore On The Soul Of Christmas"	Thomas Moore	Thomas Moore, Johnny Cunningham	50:10
Total length:				1:50:28

== Personnel ==
=== Primary artist ===
- Thomas Moore – vocalist, arranger, piano, liner notes

=== Featured vocalists ===
- Cathie Ryan – vocals
- Johnny Cunningham – vocals
- Kathy Mattea – vocals
- Mary Fahl – vocals
- Nikki Matheson – vocals
- Susan McKeown – vocals

=== Instrumentalists ===
- Akira Satake – banjo
- Ben Wittman – percussion
- Dougie MacLean – guitar
- Jamshied Sharifi – keyboards, percussion
- Jerry O’Sullivan – uilleann pipes, whistle
- John Doyle – guitar
- John Whelan – button accordion
- Lincoln Schleifer – bass
- Robin Spielberg – piano
- Stacey Shames – harp
- Séamus Egan – bodhrán, flute, whistle

=== Composers/lyricists ===
- Edmund Sears – composer
- Franz Xaver Gruber – composer
- John Henry Hopkins Jr. – composer
- Joseph Mohr – composer
- Richard Storrs Willis – composer
- D. H. Lawrence – poetry

=== Production ===
- Susan Piver – executive producer, producer
- Johnny Cunningham – producer
- Rick Rowe – editing, mastering, mixing
- Danny DePaolo – engineer
- John Jenkins – engineer
- Scott Noll – engineer

=== Art and design ===
- Jason Holley – illustrations
- Jason Rand – art direction, design
- Stacy Drummond – art direction, design

== PBS television special ==
Upon its release, the album was accompanied by a PBS Pledge Week Christmas Special of the same name. Hosted by Martin Sheen, and featuring the albums primary vocalists, the special aired daily from December 6–14, 1997. The Soul of Christmas: A Celtic Music Celebration was subsequently released for purchase on VHS.
