= Archetypal psychology =

Psychology school of thought

Archetypal psychology was initiated as a distinct movement in the early 1970s by James Hillman, a psychologist who trained in analytical psychology and became the first Director of the Jung Institute in Zürich. Hillman reports that archetypal psychology emerged partly from the Jungian tradition whilst drawing also from other traditions and authorities such as Henry Corbin, Giambattista Vico, and Plotinus.

Archetypal psychology relativizes and deliteralizes the notion of ego and focuses on what it calls the psyche, or soul, and the deepest patterns of psychic functioning, "the fundamental fantasies that animate all life" (Moore, in Hillman, 1991). Archetypal psychology likens itself to a polytheistic mythology in that it attempts to recognize the myriad fantasies and myths – gods, goddesses, demigods, mortals and animals – that shape and are shaped by our psychological lives. In this framework the ego is but one psychological fantasy within an assemblage of fantasies. Archetypal psychology is, along with the classical and developmental schools, one of the three schools of post-Jungian psychology outlined by Andrew Samuels.

== Influences ==
The main influence on the development of archetypal psychology is Carl Jung's analytical psychology. It is strongly influenced by Classical Greek, Renaissance, and Romantic ideas and thought. Influential artists, poets, philosophers and psychologists include Nietzsche, Henry Corbin, Keats, Shelley, Petrarch, and Paracelsus. Though all different in their theories and psychologies, they appear to be unified by their common concern for the psyche – the soul.

== C. G. Jung ==
Carl Gustav Jung was a Swiss psychologist who was the first father of archetypal psychology. Jungian archetypes are thought patterns that find worldwide parallels in individuals or entire cultures. Archai appear in dreams, religions, the arts, and social customs in all people and they manifest impulsively in mental disorders. According to Jung archetypal ideas and patterns reside within the collective unconscious, which is a blueprint inherent in every individual, as opposed to the personal unconscious, which contains a single individual's repressed ideas, desires and memories as described by Freud. What differentiates Jungian psychology from archetypal psychology is that Jung believed archetypes are cultural, anthropological, and transcend the empirical world of time and place, and are not observable through experience (e.g., phenomenal). On the contrary, Archetypal psychology views archetypes to always be phenomenal.

== Henry Corbin ==
Henry Corbin, a French scholar and philosopher, is the second father of archetypal psychology. Corbin created the idea of the existence of the mundus imaginalis which is a distinct field of imaginable realities and offers an ontological mode of location of archetypes of the psyche. The mundus imaginalis provided an evaluative and cosmic grounding for archetypes. The second contribution Corbin made to the field was the idea that archetypes are accessible to imagination and first present themselves as images, so the procedure of archetypal psychology must be rhetorical and poetic, without logical reasoning, and the goal in therapy should be to restore the patient's imaginable realities. Therefore, the goal of therapy is the middle ground of psychic realities, a development of a sense of soul. Also, according to Corbin, the method of therapy is the cultivation of imagination.

== Edward Casey ==
Edward S. Casey is attributed with distinguishing archetypal psychology from other theories by explaining an image as a way of seeing rather than something seen. According to Casey, an image is only perceived by imagining because an image is not what one sees but the way one sees. He also states that imagination is an activity of soul and not just a human faculty. An image appears to be more profound, more powerful, and more beautiful than the comprehension of it. This explains the drive behind the arts which provide disciplines that can actualize the complexity of the image.

== James Hillman ==
Hillman (1975) sketches a brief lineage of archetypal psychology.

By calling upon Jung to begin with, I am partly acknowledging the fundamental debt that archetypal psychology owes him. He is the immediate ancestor in a long line that stretches back through Freud, Dilthey, Coleridge, Schelling, Vico, Ficino, Plotinus, and Plato to Heraclitus – and with even more branches yet to be traced (p. xvii).

=== Polytheistic psychology ===
Thomas Moore says of James Hillman's teaching that he "portrays the psyche as inherently multiple". In Hillman's archetypal/polytheistic view, the psyche or soul has many directions and sources of meaning – and this can feel like an ongoing state of conflict – a struggle with one's daimones. According to Hillman, "polytheistic psychology can give sacred differentiation to our psychic turmoil...." Hillman states that

The power of myth, its reality, resides precisely in its power to seize and influence psychic life. The Greeks knew this so well, and so they had no depth psychology and psychopathology such as we have. They had myths. And we have no myths – instead, depth psychology and psychopathology. Therefore... psychology shows myths in modern dress and myths show our depth psychology in ancient dress."

Hillman qualifies his many references to gods as differing from a literalistic approach saying that for him they are aides memoires, i.e. sounding boards employed "for echoing life today or as bass chords giving resonance to the little melodies of life." Hillman further insists that he does not view the pantheon of gods as a 'master matrix' against which we should measure today and thereby decry modern loss of richness.

=== Psyche or soul ===
Hillman says he has been critical of the 20th century's psychologies (e.g., biological psychology, behaviorism, cognitive psychology) that have adopted a natural scientific philosophy and praxis. His main criticisms include that they are reductive, materialistic, and literal; they are psychologies without psyche, without soul. Accordingly, Hillman's oeuvre has been an attempt to restore psyche to its proper place in psychology. Hillman sees the soul at work in imagination, fantasy, myth and metaphor. He also sees soul revealed in psychopathology, in the symptoms of psychological disorders. Psyche-pathos-logos is the "speech of the suffering soul" or the soul's suffering of meaning. A great portion of Hillman's thought attempts to attend to the speech of the soul as it is revealed via images and fantasies.

Hillman has his own definition of soul. Primarily, he notes that soul is not a "thing", not an entity. Nor is it something that is located "inside" a person. Rather, soul is "a perspective rather than a substance, a viewpoint towards things... (it is) reflective; it mediates events and makes differences..."(1975). Soul is not to be located in the brain or in the head, for example (where most modern psychologies place it), but human beings are in psyche. The world, in turn, is the anima mundi, or the world ensouled. Hillman often quotes a phrase coined by the Romantic poet John Keats: "call the world the vale of soul-making."

Additionally, Hillman (1975) says he observes that soul:

refers to the deepening of events into experiences; second the significance of soul makes possible, whether in love or religious concern, derives from its special relationship with death. And third, by 'soul' I mean the imaginative possibility in our natures, the experiencing through reflective speculation, dream, image, fantasy—that mode which recognizes all realities as primarily symbolic or metaphorical.

The notion of soul as imaginative possibility, in relation to the archai or root metaphors, is what Hillman has termed the "poetic basis of mind".

=== Dream analysis ===
Because Hillman's archetypal psychology is concerned with fantasy, myth, and image, dreams are considered to be significant in relation to the soul. Hillman does not believe that dreams are simply random residue or flotsam from waking life (as advanced by physiologists), but neither does he believe that dreams are compensatory for the struggles of waking life, or are invested with "secret" meanings of how one should live (à la Jung). Rather, "dreams tell us where we are, not what to do" (1979). Therefore, Hillman is against the 20th century traditional interpretive methods of dream analysis. Hillman's approach is phenomenological rather than analytic (which breaks the dream down into its constituent parts) and interpretive/hermeneutic (which may make a dream image "something other" than what it appears to be in the dream). His dictum with regard to dream content and process is "Stick with the image."

Hillman (1983) describes his position succinctly:

For instance, a black snake comes in a dream, a great big black snake, and you can spend a whole hour with this black snake talking about the devouring mother, talking about anxiety, talking about the repressed sexuality, talking about the natural mind, all those interpretive moves that people make, and what is left, what is vitally important, is what this snake is doing, this crawling huge black snake that's walking into your life... and the moment you've defined the snake, you've interpreted it, you've lost the snake, you've stopped it.... The task of analysis is to keep the snake there....

The snake in the dream does not become something else: it is none of the things Hillman mentioned, and neither is it a penis, as Hillman says Freud might have maintained, nor the serpent from the Garden of Eden, as Hillman thinks Jung might have mentioned. It is not something someone can look up in a dream dictionary; its meaning has not been given in advance. Rather, the black snake is the black snake. Approaching the dream snake phenomenologically simply means describing the snake and attending to how the snake appears as a snake in the dream. It is a huge black snake, that is given. But are there other snakes in the dream? If so, is it bigger than the other snakes? Smaller? Is it a black snake among green snakes? Or is it alone? What is the setting, a desert or a rain forest? Is the snake getting ready to feed? Shedding its skin? Sunning itself on a rock? All of these questions are elicited from the primary image of the snake in the dream, and as such can be rich material revealing the psychological life of the dreamer and the life of the psyche spoken through the dream.

=== The Soul's Code ===
Hillman's 1996 book, The Soul's Code: In Search of Character and Calling, outlines an "acorn theory of the soul". His theory states that each individual holds the potential for their unique possibilities inside themselves already, much as an acorn holds the pattern for an oak, invisible within itself. It argues against the parental fallacy whereby our parents are seen as crucial in determining who we are by supplying us with genetic material and behavioral patterns. Instead the book suggests for a reconnection with what is invisible within us, our daimon or soul or acorn and the acorn's calling to the wider world of nature. It argues against theories which attempt to map life into phases, suggesting that this is counter-productive and makes people feel like they are failing to live up to what is normal. This in turn produces a truncated, normalized society of soulless mediocrity where evil is not allowed but injustice is everywhere – a society that cannot tolerate eccentricity or the further reaches of life experiences but sees them as illnesses to be medicated out of existence.

Hillman diverges from Jung and his idea of the Self. Hillman sees Jung as too prescriptive and argues against the idea of life-maps by which to try to grow properly.

Instead, Hillman suggests a reappraisal of each individual's childhood and present life to try to find the individual's particular calling, the acorn of the soul. He has written that he is the one to help precipitate a re-souling of the world in the space between rationality and psychology. He replaces the notion of growing up, with the myth of growing down from the womb into a messy, confusing earthy world. Hillman rejects formal logic in favour of reference to case histories of well known people and considers his arguments to be in line with the puer aeternus or eternal youth whose brief burning existence could be seen in the work of romantic poets like Keats and Byron and in recently deceased young rock stars like Jeff Buckley or Kurt Cobain. Hillman also rejects causality as a defining framework and suggests in its place a shifting form of fate whereby events are not inevitable but bound to be expressed in some way dependent on the character of the soul or acorn in question.

== Psychopathology and therapy ==
Psychopathology is viewed as the psyche's independent ability to create morbidity, disorder, illness, abnormality and suffering in any part of its behavior and to imagine and experience life through a deformed perspective.

Archetypal psychology follows the following procedures for therapy:

- Regular meetings
- Face-to-face
- The therapist chooses the location
- A fee is charged

These procedures may be modified depending on the therapist and the client. In therapy both the therapist and client explore the client's habitual behavior, feelings, fantasies, dreams, memories, and ideas. The goal of therapy is the improvement of the client and termination of treatment. Goals are not stated for therapy.

== Influence ==
Hillman's archetypal or imaginal psychology influenced a number of younger analysts and colleagues, among the most well known being Thomas Moore and Jungian analyst Stanton Marlan. A brief history of the early influence of Hillman and of archetypal/imaginal psychology can be found in Marlan's Archetypal Psychologies.

== Criticism ==
See James Hillman: Criticism

== See also ==
- Archetypal pedagogy
- Analytical psychology
- Polytheistic myth as psychology
- Psychological astrology

== Select bibliography ==
- Hillman, James (2004). A Terrible Love of War. Penguin. ISBN 1-59420-011-4.
- Hillman, James (1999). The Force of Character. Random House. ISBN 0-375-50120-7.
- Hillman, James (1998). The Myth of Analysis: Three Essays in Archetypal Psychology. Northwestern University Press. ISBN 0-8101-1651-0.
- Hillman, James (1997). The Soul's Code: On Character and Calling. Random House. ISBN 0-446-67371-4.
- Hillman, James (1995). Kinds of Power: A Guide to its Intelligent Uses. Currency Doubleday. ISBN 0-385-48967-6.
- Hillman, James (1983). Healing Fiction. Station Hill Press. ISBN 0-930794-55-9.
- Hillman, James; Michael Ventura (1993). We've Had a Hundred Years of Psychotherapy – And the World's Getting Worse. HarperCollins. ISBN 0-06-250661-7.
- Hillman, James (1992). The Thought the Heart and the Soul of the World. Spring Publications. ISBN 0-88214-353-0.
- Hillman, James (1997). Archetypal Psychology: A Brief Account. Spring Publications. ISBN 0-88214-373-5.
- Hillman, James; Carl Gustav Jung (1985). Anima: An Anatomy of a Personified Notion. ISBN 0-88214-316-6.
- Inter Views (with Laura Pozzo), 1983
- Hillman, James (1973). The Dream and the Underworld. HarperCollins. ISBN 0-06-090682-0.
- Hillman, James (1975). Loose Ends: Primary Papers in Archetypal Psychology. Spring Publications. ISBN 0-88214-308-5.
- Hillman, James (1975). Re-Visioning Psychology (based on his Yale University Terry Lectures).

=== Other writers ===
- Berry, Patricia (1982). Echo's Subtle Body.
- Clift, Jean Dalby; Wallace Clift (1996). The Archetype of Pilgrimage: Outer Action with Inner Meaning. Paulist Press. ISBN 0-8091-3599-X.
- Daniels, Aaron (2011). Imaginal Reality, Volume 1: Journey to the Voids. Aeon Books. ISBN 978-1-90465-849-8.
- Daniels, Aaron (2011). Imaginal Reality, Volume 2: Voidcraft. Aeon Books. ISBN 978-1-90465-856-6.
- Dennis, Sandra Lee (2001). Embrace of the Daimon. Nicolas-Hays. ISBN 0-89254-056-7.
- Hall, Nor, The Moon and The Virgin.
- Kugler, Paul, The Alchemy of Discourse.
- Lockhart, Russell, Words As Eggs: Psyche in Language and Clinic.
- Miller, David L., Hells and Holy Ghosts.
- Miller, David L. (2005). Christs. Spring Journal. ISBN 1-882670-93-0.
- Moore, Thomas (1990). The Planets Within. SteinerBooks. ISBN 0-940262-28-2.
- Moore, Thomas (1994). Dark Eros. Spring Publications. ISBN 0-88214-365-4.
- Paris, Ginnette (1986). Pagan Meditations: The Worlds of Aphrodite, Artemis, and Hestia. Spring Publications. ISBN 0-88214-330-1.
- Paris, Ginnette (1990). Pagan Grace: Dionysos, Hermes, and Goddess Memory in Daily Life. Spring Publications. ISBN 0-88214-342-5.
- Romanyshyn, Robert, The Soul in Grief.
- Romanyshyn, Robert (1989). Technology as Symptom and Dream.
- Romanyshyn, Robert (2001). Mirror and Metaphor: Images and Stories of Psychological Life.
- Sardello, Robert, The Power of Soul.
- Samuels, Andrew (1986). Jung and the Post-Jungians (1st ed.). Routledge. ISBN 978-0710208644.
- Simmer, Stephen, The Academy of the Dead.
- Watkins, Mary, Waking Dreams.
- Zelitchenko, Alexander (2006). Svet Zhizni [Light of Life] (in Russian).
- Ziegler, Alfred (2000). Archetypal Madicine. Spring Publications. ISBN 0-88214-374-3.
