= Michael Ventura =

American novelist

- Born: October 31, 1945 (age 80); United States
- Occupation: Writer

Michael Ventura (born October 31, 1945) is an American novelist, screenwriter, film director, essayist and cultural critic.

== History ==
Michael Ventura commenced his career as a journalist at the Austin Sun, a counter-culture bi-weekly newspaper published in the 1970s. In 1978, Ventura co-founded the LA Weekly along with Joie Davidow, Jay Levin, and Ginger Varney.

Ventura is best known for his long-running column, "Letters at 3 A.M.", which first appeared in LA Weekly in the early 1980s and continued in the Austin Chronicle until 2015. One of his essay collections -- Letters at 3 A.M.: Reports on Endarkenment (1994) -- is an anthology of his most well-known published columns from this period of work. His first essay collection, Shadow-Dancing in the U.S.A. (1985) also collected work that originally appeared in alternative weeklies and other journalistic publications.

Ventura has published three novels: Night Time Losing Time (1989), The Zoo Where You're Fed to God (1994), and The Death of Frank Sinatra (1996). An excerpt from his novel about Miriam of Magdala was published in the third issue of the CalArts literary journal Black Clock in 2005. With psychologist James Hillman, Ventura co-authored the 1992 bestseller We've Had a Hundred Years of Psychotherapy – And the World's Getting Worse.

Other books by Ventura include If I Was a Highway with Butch Hancock (2017), Cassavetes Directs: John Cassavetes and the Making of Love Streams (2008), and Marilyn Monroe: From Beginning to End (2008).

Ventura appears as a fictional character in Steve Erickson's 1996 novel, Amnesiascope.

He also wrote the screenplay for Echo Park (1986), among other films, including Roadie (1980).

He curated the Sundance Festival's 1989 retrospective on John Cassavetes.

== Bibliography ==
=== Novels ===
- Night Time Losing Time (1989)
- The Zoo Where You're Fed to God (1994)
- The Death of Frank Sinatra (1996)

=== Nonfiction ===
- Shadow-Dancing in the U.S.A. (1985)
- We've Had a Hundred Years of Psychotherapy – And the World's Getting Worse (1992) (with James Hillman)
- Letters at 3 A.M.: Reports on Endarkenment (1994)
- Cassavetes Directs (2007)

=== Screenplays ===
- Roadie (1980)
- Echo Park (1986)

== Film director ==
- I'm Almost Not Crazy: John Cassavetes, the Man and His Work (1984)

== Awards ==
- USA PEN award
- Los Angeles Press Club Award
- Upton Sinclair Award from the Liberty Hill Foundation
