= Pat McDonald =

Pat or Patrick McDonald may refer to:

- Pat McDonald (actress) (1921–1990), Australian actress
- Pat McDonald (politician) (born 1943), member of the Vermont House of Representatives
- Pat McDonald (shot putter) (1878–1954), American athlete
- Patrick McDonald (curler) (born 1967), American wheelchair curler
- Patrick McDonald (director), artistic director of the Green Thumb Theatre, Vancouver, British Columbia, Canada
- Patrick McDonald (politician), member of the Idaho House of Representatives
- Patrick McDonald (soccer) (born 2003), American soccer player
- Patrick Range McDonald, American journalist and author
- P. J. McDonald (Patrick Joseph McDonald, born 1982), Irish jockey

== See also ==
- Pat MacDonald (disambiguation)
