= David Tacey =

Australian writer and interdisciplinary scholar

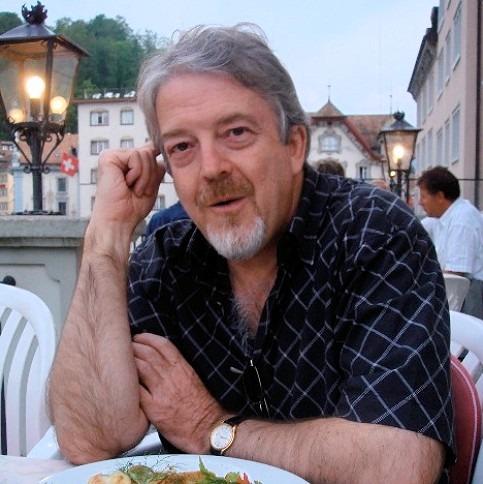
- Born: Melbourne, Australia
- Education: BA Hons (Flinders), PhD (Adelaide)
- Occupations: Writer, interdisciplinary scholar

David Tacey is an Australian public intellectual, writer and interdisciplinary scholar. He is Emeritus Professor of Literature at La Trobe University in Melbourne and a research professor at the Australian Centre for Christianity and Culture in Canberra.

== Early years and education ==
Tacey was born in Melbourne but much of his younger life was spent in Alice Springs in central Australia. Growing up alongside Aboriginal cultures influenced him greatly and he has maintained a lifelong interest in Aboriginal religions, indigenous health and wellbeing. His secondary education was at Alice Springs High School. After completing secondary school in 1970, he worked as a labourer for a year to fund his future university education. He studied literature, philosophy and art history at Flinders University in Adelaide, South Australia, where he obtained his BA (Honours) degree in 1975. He transferred to the University of Adelaide and completed his PhD in literature and Analytical psychology in 1981.

Tacey was awarded a Harkness Post-Doctoral Fellowship of the Commonwealth Fund, New York. In 1982 and 1983 he pursued advanced studies in symbolism and mythology in the United States. He studied with James Hillman and Thomas Moore in Dallas, Texas, and Martin Bickman and Harold Schechter in Boulder, Colorado. During his Harkness Fellowship he travelled extensively in the United States and Mexico.

== Academic career ==
Tacey is one of Australia's public intellectuals, well known in the arts, religious and psychotherapy communities. He is known internationally, especially in the fields of spirituality studies, Analytical psychology and Psychoanalysis. He is a frequent commentator on radio and has appeared numerous times on television. He is invited to speak on issues of spirituality, religious belief and indigenous cultures. His views are sought on mental health, suicide, depression, anxiety, initiation and rites of passage.

Tacey has appeared on programs broadcast by the Australian Broadcasting Corporation (ABC) and the Special Broadcasting Service (SBS) in Australia, and the British Broadcasting Corporation (BBC) Radio Four. He has also appeared in programs broadcast by the Canadian Broadcasting Corporation (CBC), the Public Broadcasting Service (PBS) in the United States and the New Zealand Broadcasting Corporation (NZBC).

In 1984 he taught in the School of English and Linguistics at Macquarie University, Sydney. He then moved to Melbourne, where from 1985 to 2014 he taught various subjects in English literature and Interdisciplinary Studies at La Trobe University. He retired from academic life in 2014 to commence a new phase as an independent scholar.

Tacey is the author of 14 books and over 150 articles and essays. Some of his writings have been translated into Mandarin, Korean, Spanish, Portuguese and French.

His public intellectual life began in 1995, when he published Edge of the Sacred, a work which became a best-seller and attracted the interest of the Paul Keating administration. It was recommended by cultural advisers as a work which shaped the direction of Australian society in its vision of Aboriginal reconciliation. The Australian poet Les Murray described the book as a work which offered a frame of reference for a future Australian republic.

During the 1990s, Tacey organised conferences on Analytical psychology and made La Trobe a national focus for this field of research. In the late 1990s, his research moved into the area of men's studies, with the publication of Remaking Men in 1997. The book was voted one of the best ten books of the year by The Age newspaper in Melbourne and The Sydney Morning Herald.

Tacey became interested in the role of religion and spirituality in secular societies and published several books on this subject, including Re-Enchantment and The Spirituality Revolution. He is often invited to address religious schools and education conferences on the subject of youth spirituality. He is often consulted by church leaders to foster ecclesial and lay understanding of the function of spirituality and mysticism in today's postmodern world. In 2000 he was invited to represent Australia at a congress on religion and world peace at the United Nations, New York. His book Religion as Metaphor: Beyond Literal Belief brings together his interests in symbolism, scripture, depth psychology and literature.

Tacey has specialised in the analytical psychology of C. G. Jung and for twenty years at La Trobe he co-taught, with philosopher Robert Farrell, on "Jung's cultural psychology". In this field he published Jung and the New Age; The Idea of the Numinous: Contemporary Jungian and Psychoanalytic Perspectives (with Ann Casement); Gods and Diseases: Making Sense of our Physical and Mental Wellbeing; How to Read Jung and The Darkening Spirit: Jung, Spirituality, Religion. In 2012 he edited the scholarly volume The Jung Reader for Routledge. During his last six years at La Trobe, he co-taught, with sociologist John Carroll, The Crisis of Meaning in the 21st Century.

Tacey is on the editorial boards of several international journals and in 2001 he was invited to lecture at the C. G. Jung Institute in Zürich. He gave regular summer courses in Zürich until 2010. In 2002 he became a founding member of the International Association for Jungian Studies. In 2006 he was William J. Shannon Visiting Professor in Religious Studies at Nazareth College, Rochester, New York, United States; and Lloyd Geering Visiting Professor in Religious Studies at Victoria University of Wellington, New Zealand. He has been invited to speak at conferences in the United Kingdom, the United States, Canada, South Africa, Denmark, New Zealand and Korea.

== Bibliography ==
- Religion as Metaphor: Beyond Literal Belief. New Brunswick, USA and London, 2015; USA and UK: Transaction Publishers (ISBN 978-1-4128-5610-2 hbk); Melbourne: Garratt Publishing (ISBN 978-1-925-00979-8 pbk)
- The Darkening Spirit: Jung, Spirituality, Religion. London and New York: Routledge, 2013 (ISBN 978-0-415-52702-6 hbk; ISBN 978-0-415-52703-3 pbk; ISBN 978-0-203-54622-2 ebk)
- The Jung Reader (edited). London and New York: Routledge, 2012 (ISBN 978-0-415-58983-3 hbk; ISBN 978-0-415-58984-0 pbk)
- Placing Psyche: Exploring Cultural Complexes in Australia (edited with Craig San Roque and Amanda Dowd). New Orleans, Louisiana: Spring Journal Books, 2011 (ISBN 978-1-935-52817-3 pbk)
- Gods and Diseases: Making Sense of Our Physical and Mental Wellbeing. Sydney: Harper Collins, 2011 (ISBN 978-0-7322-9217-1 pbk), published in London and New York: Routledge, 2012 (ISBN 978-0-415-52062-1 hbk; ISBN 978-0-415-52063-8 pbk)
- The Idea of the Numinous: Contemporary Jungian and Psychoanalytic Perspectives (edited with Ann Casement). London & New York: Routledge, 2009 (ISBN 1-58391-784-5)
- How to Read Jung. London: Granta, 2006 (ISBN 1862077266); New York: W. W. Norton, 2007 (ISBN 0-393-32953-4)
- The Spirituality Revolution: The Emergence of Contemporary Spirituality. Melbourne and Sydney: HarperCollins, 2004 (ISBN 1-58391-874-4)
- Jung and the New Age. Brunner-Routledge, 2001 (ISBN 1-58391-160-X)
- Re-Enchantment: The New Australian Spirituality. Melbourne and Sydney: HarperCollins, 2000 (ISBN 0-7322-6524-X)
- Remaking Men: Jung, Spirituality and Social Change. London and New York: Routledge, 1997 (ISBN 0-415-14241-5)
  - published in Australia as Remaking Men: The Revolution in Masculinity. Melbourne: Viking, 1997 (ISBN 0-670-87845-6)
- Edge of the Sacred: Transformation in Australia. Melbourne and Sydney: HarperCollins, 1995 (ISBN 1-86371-408-1)
  - Edge of the Sacred: Jung, Psyche, Earth; revised and expanded international edition. Einsiedeln, Switzerland: Daimon Publishers, 2009 (ISBN 3-85630-729-X)
- Patrick White: Fiction and the Unconscious. Melbourne: Oxford University Press, 1988 (ISBN 0-19-554867-1)
