= LA Weekly =

American weekly alternative newspaper

- 2012 edition featuring musician Syd
- Type: Alternative weekly
- Format: Tabloid
- Owner: Semanal Media LLC
- Founder(s): Jay Levin, Joie Davidow, Michael Ventura, Ginger Varney
- Editor: Mark Stefanos
- Founded: 1978; 48 years ago
- Headquarters: 724 S. Spring Street, Los Angeles, California, 90014
- Country: United States
- Circulation: 160,128 (as of 2016)
- ISSN: 0192-1940
- Website: www.laweekly.com
- Free online archives: cdnc.ucr.edu (1978-1999)

LA Weekly is a free weekly alternative newspaper in Los Angeles, California. The paper covers music, arts, film, theater, culture, and other local news in the Los Angeles area, in addition to sponsoring local events. LA Weekly was founded in 1978 by Jay Levin (among others), and he served as the publication's editor from 1978 to 1991, as well as its president from 1978 to 1992.

In March 2024, the publication offered buyouts to a majority of its staff. As of July 2024, WIRED reported that many articles on the publication's website were AI-generated advertorials about OnlyFans creators.

== Publication history ==
=== Founding ===
Jay Levin put together an investment group that included actor Michael Douglas, Burt Kleiner, Joe Benadon, and Pete Kameron. Levin's co-founders included Joie Davidow, Michael Ventura, and Ginger Varney. Levin was formerly the publisher of the Los Angeles Free Press.

The majority of the LA Weekly's initial staff members (Note: Jay Levin, Joie Davidow, Michael Ventura, Ginger Varney, Bill Bentley and Big Boy Medlin, "supported in the early days by Tracy Johnston and then Phil Tracy and a host of freelancers.") came from the Austin Sun, (Note: Ventura, Varney, Bentley and Medlin had all previously been associated with the Austin Sun.) a similar-natured bi-weekly, which had recently ceased publication. The group were inspired to create the LA Weekly by their work at the Sun as well as other alternative weeklies such as the Chicago Reader and Boston's The Real Paper and The Phoenix. Levin also retained many of the writers he had earlier brought to the Los Angeles Free Press, and installed Davidow as editor of the arts and entertainment section.

LA Weekly's first issue featured a group of female comedians, including the then-little known Sandra Bernhard, on its cover. Subsequent issues featured exposés on the Los Angeles basin's air quality and U.S. interventionism in Central America. The paper also quickly became notable for its coverage of independent cinema and the Los Angeles music scene. Davidow produced a comprehensive calendar section and explored undiscovered fashion districts, discovering new designers.

=== Branching out ===
In 1985, LA Weekly launched a glossy magazine, L.A. Style, which Davidow edited. L.A. Style was sold to American Express Publishing in 1988 (it merged with BUZZ magazine in 1993).

By 1990, LA Weekly had a circulation of 165,000, making it the largest urban weekly in the U.S.

Co-founder Jay Levin stepped down as president in 1992 to pursue other ventures. Co-founders Michael Ventura and Ginger Varney left the publication in 1993. The founding team was succeeded by Michael Sigman as publisher and Kit Rachlis as editor.

=== Acquisition by Stern Publishing ===
LA Weekly was sold to Stern Publishing, owner of The Village Voice, in 1994.

=== Acquisition by New Times Media/Village Voice Media ===
New Times Media acquired Stern Publishing (and LA Weekly) in 2004, assuming the Village Voice Media name in October 2005. At that point, Village Voice Media owned a chain of 17 alternative weeklies with a combined circulation of 1.8 million.

Some former employees complained about personnel moves after the sale. For instance, Harold Meyerson, once the Weekly's political editor, charged in a departing email to Weekly staffers in 2006 that the new owners had grafted a cookie-cutter template for editorial content onto the publication.

Belt-tightening in 2009 led to internal cutbacks, resulting in the paper eliminating the position of managing editor, letting go of several staff writers and other editorial department positions, as well as cutting the entire fact-checking department. New Times Media replaced news editor Alan Mittelstaedt with New Times LA editor Jill Stewart. Writers once closely associated with the Weekly but let go by the paper's management during that period included Meyerson, theater critic Steven Leigh Morris, film critic Ella Taylor, and columnist Marc Cooper.

Management said staff cuts were necessary owing to poor economic conditions. However, some of the cuts were likely attributable to philosophical differences with the paper's then-owners (who have since sold the chain). (Note: During that period, Rick Barrs, editor of the Weekly's sister paper Phoenix New Times, left comments on Marc Cooper's blog stating that "your old, hippy-dippy paper has gone the way of the dinosaur. extinct. bye, bye.") Former staff writer Matthew Fleischer said at the time that "as part of the company's 'plug-and-play' management strategy, editors, writers, and ad directors were moved from city to city within the chain, without regard for local knowledge. Any old-school Village Voice Media manager who resisted the metamorphosis was denounced as a 'lefty,' a 'throwback,' and worse. They were fired or simply fled."

Despite this upheaval, the paper won a Pulitzer Prize in 2006, and in 2009 broke the story of the "Grim Sleeper" serial killer. At the 2009 Los Angeles Press Club Awards, the Weekly won six first-place awards, including three by staff writer Christine Pelisek, who was honored in the Investigative Reporting, Hard News, and News Feature categories.

=== Acquisition by Voice Media Group ===
In September 2012, Village Voice Media executives Scott Tobias, Christine Brennan and Jeff Mars bought Village Voice Media's papers and associated web properties from its founders and formed Voice Media Group.

The paper won journalism awards before and after this transition, with two of its news writers, Patrick Range McDonald and Gene Maddaus, winning the Los Angeles Press Club's nod for "Journalist of the Year".

=== Acquisition by Semanal Media LLC ===
In November 2017, the publication was sold to Semanal Media LLC, whose parent company is listed as Street Media. In December 2017, it was revealed that the new owners of Semanal Media LLC included "David Welch, a Los Angeles-based attorney with ties to the cannabis industry; philanthropist Kevin Xu, an investor with biotech firm Mebo International; attorney Steve Mehr; boutique hotelier Paul Makarechian; real estate developer Mike Mugel; and Southern California investor Andy Bequer", all residents of Orange County, California. The new operation manager was Brian Calle.

In August 2018, David Welch sued the other co-owners, alleging "they've pillaged the company."

Street Media also owns The Village Voice, Irvine Weekly, Marina Times, and The Laker/Lutz News.

In March 2024, the publication offered buyouts to a majority of its staff. As of July 2024, WIRED reported that many articles on the publication's website were AI-generated advertorials about OnlyFans creators.

== Sponsored events ==
In 1979, the paper established the LA Weekly Theater Awards, which awarded small theatre productions (99 seats or less) in Los Angeles. In December 2014, LA Weekly announced that it was discontinuing the awards, citing the publication's desire to focus on events that would promote its profitability.

From 2006 to 2009, LA Weekly hosted the LA Weekly Detour Music Festival each October. The entire block surrounding Los Angeles City Hall was closed off to accommodate the festival's three stages.

Since 2008, LA Weekly has hosted a food and wine festival, now dubbed The Essentials, that draws sizable crowds.

== Notable staff and contributors ==
Some of the publication's recent notable writers are Pulitzer Prize-winning food writer Jonathan Gold, who left in early 2012; and Nikki Finke, who blogged about the film industry through the Weekly's website and published a print column in the paper each week, leaving in June 2009 after the blog she founded, Deadline Hollywood Daily, was acquired by an online firm.

On June 1, 2009, the paper announced that Editor-in-Chief Laurie Ochoa, who began helming the paper in 2001 (before the New Times acquisition), was "parting ways" with the Weekly. Though some speculated that Jill Stewart was guaranteed for the position, the job quickly went to Drex Heikes, formerly of the Los Angeles Times. When Heikes left in 2011, he was replaced by Sarah Fenske.

In 2009, former Los Angeles Times food writer Amy Scattergood became food blogger at LA Weekly's Squid Ink, and was later promoted to food editor. In late 2009, the paper hired Dennis Romero, formerly of Ciudad magazine, as a full-time news blogger.

Following the recession, in 2012, the paper added food critic Besha Rodell, a James Beard Foundation Award nominee and former food editor of Atlanta's Creative Loafing.

In 2013, the paper named Amy Nicholson its lead film critic.

In 2016, LA Weekly named multimedia journalist and Emmy-winning producer Drew Tewksbury as managing editor.

As of 2022, the editor-in-chief and creative director is Darrick Rainey, the music editor is Brett Callwood, the culture & entertainment editor is Lina Lecaro, the arts editor is Shana Nys Dambrot and the food editor is Michele Stueven. The publisher and CEO is Brian Calle.

In June 2022, the Los Angeles Press Club named news reporter Isai Rocha as its "Journalist of the Year" for print publications under 50,000 in circulation at the 64th Annual Southern California Journalism Awards.

In 2024, LA Weekly shed most of its editorial staff due to financial struggles. As of December 2024, the Editor-in-Chief is Mark Stefanos, and as of April 2025, Michele Stueven is Senior Editor. In June 2026, the Los Angeles Press Club named Mark Stefanos as its "Journalist of the Year" for print publications under 50,000 in circulation at the 68th Annual Southern California Journalism Awards.
