= I'm Almost Not Crazy: John Cassavetes, the Man and His Work =

- Directed by: Michael Ventura
- Written by: Michael Ventura
- Produced by: Yoram Globus; Menahem Golan
- Starring: John Cassavetes; Gena Rowlands; Seymour Cassel
- Cinematography: Gideon Porath
- Edited by: Daniel Wetherbee
- Distributed by: Cannon Group
- Release date: 1984
- Running time: 60 minutes
- Country: United States
- Language: English

I'm Almost Not Crazy: John Cassavetes, the Man and His Work is a 1984 documentary directed by Michael Ventura and starring John Cassavetes in his final film appearance.

== Overview ==
Filmed in 1984, the filmmakers document Cassavetes during the making of Love Streams, the last film he both wrote and directed. Originally released following Cassavetes' death in 1989, the documentary is featured on the 2014 Criterion release of the film.
