= The Death of Frank Sinatra =

1996 novel by Michael Ventura

- Author: Michael Ventura
- Language: English
- Genre: Fiction
- Published: 1996
- Publication place: United States
- Pages: 305
- ISBN: 9780805037388

The Death of Frank Sinatra is a 1996 novel by Michael Ventura.

== Plot ==
Mike Rose is a Las Vegas private eye. His schizophrenic brother Alvi is released from the mental hospital and mouths off to Zig, a gangster who long ago killed Rose's father and slept with his mother. Plus a devilish client wants Rose to murder her husband.
