= Laurie Ochoa =

American journalist and food critic

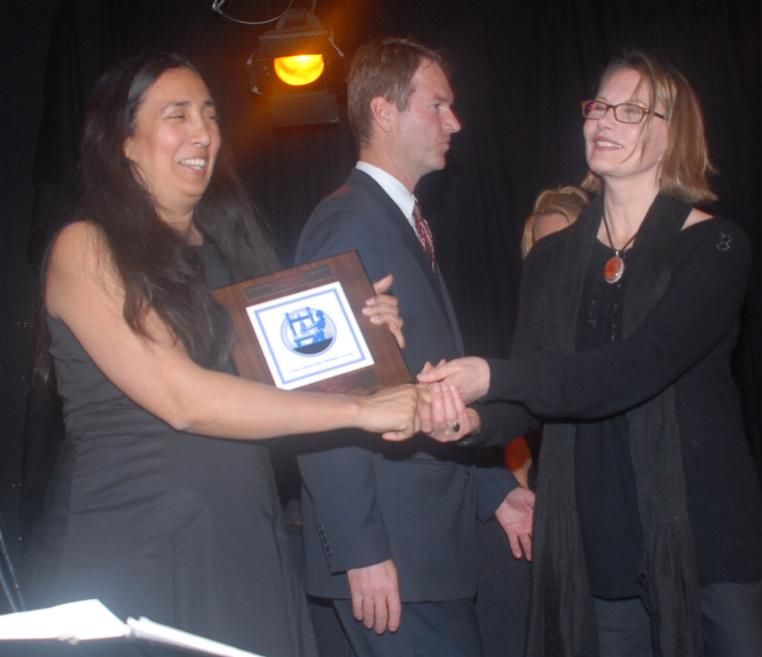
- Ochoa (left) in 2008
- Born: Whittier, California, US
- Occupations: Journalist, food writer
- Spouse: Jonathan Gold (m. 1990; died 2018)

Laurie Ochoa is an American journalist and food critic.

After beginning her career at the alternative newspaper LA Weekly, Ochoa became a writer and editor for the Los Angeles Times. She then was hired as executive editor at Gourmet before moving back to Los Angeles to lead LA Weekly. She later returned to the Times as its arts and entertainment editor, becoming general manager of the newspaper's Food section in 2022.

== Early life ==
Ochoa was born in Whittier, California. She had an early interest in journalism, interning in college at CNN before graduating in 1984.

== Career ==
Ochoa began her print journalism career as an intern at LA Weekly in 1984. She went on to write for the alt weekly and serve as special sections editor there until 1988.

She then left to become an editor and writer at the Los Angeles Times, working in the Calendar and Food sections. In 1999, she was hired by Ruth Reichl, who had previously hired her at the Times, as executive editor of Gourmet in New York.

In 2001, Ochoa returned to Los Angeles to work as editor-in-chief of LA Weekly. She resigned from her role at the publication in 2009. She then returned to the Los Angeles Times in 2012 as the paper's arts and entertainment editor. In 2022, she became general manager of the newspaper's Food section.

In 2010, she founded the quarterly literary magazine Slake alongside Joe Donnelly.

Ochoa is president of the California Chicano News Media Association.

== Awards and recognition ==
Ochoa is the recipient of two James Beard Foundation Awards: Best Newspaper Series in 1997 for her work at the Los Angeles Times, and Best Magazine or Newspaper Series in 2001 for her work at Gourmet alongside David Karp and Warren Schultz.

She was also nominated in 1998 for Best Newspaper Series for her work at the Los Angeles Times, and in 1997 for her work with Nancy Silverton on the book Nancy Silverton's Bread from The La Brea Bakery: Recipes For The Connoisseur.

== Personal life ==
Ochoa married Jonathan Gold in 1990. The couple met while both were working at LA Weekly in 1984. They subsequently followed each other to work together at other publications, including Gourmet and the Los Angeles Times. They had two children, Isabel and Leon. Gold died of pancreatic cancer in 2018.
