= Pat MacDonald =

Pat or Patrick MacDonald may refer to:

- Pat MacDonald (gridiron football) (born 1982), Canadian-born football player
- Pat MacDonald (musician) (born 1952), American musician and songwriter for the band Timbuk3

== See also ==
- Pat McDonald (disambiguation)
