= James Hillman =

American psychologist (1926–2011)

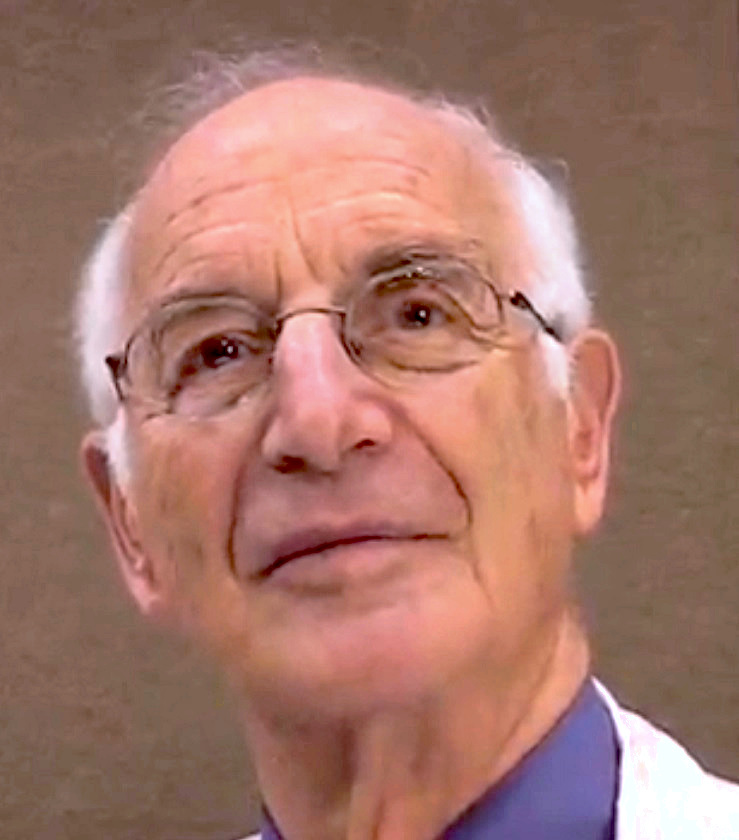
- Hillman in 2004
- Born: April 12, 1926; Atlantic City, New Jersey, U.S.
- Died: October 27, 2011 (aged 85); Thompson, Connecticut, U.S.
- Occupation: Psychologist
- Years active: 1965–2006

James Hillman (April 12, 1926 – October 27, 2011) was an American psychologist. He studied at, and then guided studies for, the C.G. Jung Institute in Zürich. He founded a movement toward archetypal psychology and retired into private practice, writing and traveling to lecture, until his death at his home in Connecticut.

== Early life and education ==
Hillman was born in Atlantic City, New Jersey in 1926. He was the third child of four born to Madeleine and Julian Hillman. James was born in Breakers Hotel, one of the hotels his father owned. His maternal grandfather was Joseph Krauskopf, a rabbi in the Reform Judaism movement, who emigrated to the United States from Prussia. After high school, he studied at the Edmund A. Walsh School of Foreign Service for two years. He served in the U.S. Navy Hospital Corps from 1944 to 1946, after which he attended the University of Paris, studying English Literature, and Trinity College, Dublin, graduating with a degree in mental and moral science in 1950. He began his career as associate editor for the Irish literary review, Envoy. In 1953 he moved to Switzerland where he met Carl Gustav Jung and began to study his work. He also met there and became friends with the maverick young Swiss doctor and psychotherapist, Adolf Guggenbühl-Craig. In 1959, he received his Ph.D. from the University of Zurich, as well as his analyst's diploma from the C. G. Jung Institute, and was then appointed as the director of studies at the institute, a position he held until 1969.

== Career ==
In 1970, Hillman became editor of Spring Publications, a publishing company devoted to advancing Archetypal Psychology as well as publishing books on mythology, philosophy and art. His magnum opus, Re-visioning Psychology, was written in 1975 and nominated for the Pulitzer Prize. Hillman then helped co-found the Dallas Institute for Humanities and Culture in 1978. His 1997 book, The Soul's Code: In Search of Character and Calling, was on The New York Times Best Seller List that year. His works and ideas about philosophy and psychology have also been popularized by other authors such as the psychotherapist Thomas Moore. His published works, essays, manuscripts, research notes, and correspondence (through 1999) reside at OPUS Archives and Research Center, located on the campuses of Pacifica Graduate Institute in Carpinteria, California.

Hillman was married three times, lastly to Margot McLean-Hillman, who survived him. He has four children from his first marriage. He died at his home in Thompson, Connecticut, in 2011, from bone cancer.

== Archetypal psychology ==
Archetypal psychology is a polytheistic psychology, in that it attempts to recognize the myriad fantasies and myths that shape and are shaped by our psychological lives. The ego is but one psychological fantasy within an assemblage of fantasies. To illustrate the multiple personifications of psyche Hillman made reference to gods, goddesses, demigods and other imaginal figures which he referred to as sounding boards "for echoing life today or as bass chords giving resonance to the little melodies of daily life" although he insisted that these figures should not be used as a 'master matrix' against which we should measure today and thereby decry modern loss of richness. Archetypal psychology is part of the Jungian psychology tradition and related to Jung's original Analytical psychology but is also a radical departure from it in some respects.

Whereas Jung’s psychology focused on the Self, its dynamics and its constellations (ego, anima, animus, shadow), Hillman’s Archetypal psychology relativizes and deliteralizes the ego and focuses on psyche, or soul, and the archai, the deepest patterns of psychic functioning, "the fundamental fantasies that animate all life"

In Re-Visioning Psychology (1975) Hillman sketches a brief lineage of archetypal psychology:

By calling upon Jung to begin with, I am partly acknowledging the fundamental debt that archetypal psychology owes him. He is the immediate ancestor in a long line that stretches back through Freud, Dilthey, Coleridge, Schelling, Vico, Ficino, Plotinus, and Plato to Heraclitus – and with even more branches yet to be traced. (p. xvii)

The development of archetypal psychology is influenced by Carl Jung's analytical psychology and Classical Greek, Renaissance, and Romantic ideas and thought. Hillman’s influences include Friedrich Nietzsche, Martin Heidegger, Henry Corbin, John Keats, Percy Bysshe Shelley, Petrarch, and Paracelsus, who share a common concern for psyche.

Hillman in turn influenced a number of younger Jungian analysts and colleagues, among the most well known being the popular author Thomas Moore (spiritual writer) and Jungian analyst Stanton Marlan. Some of the early history of this influence is traced in Marlan's Archetypal Psychologies.

=== Psyche or soul ===
Hillman has been critical of the 20th century’s psychologies (e.g., biological psychology, behaviorism, cognitive psychology) that have adopted a natural scientific philosophy and praxis. The main criticisms include that they are reductive, materialistic, and literal; they are psychologies without psyche, without soul. Accordingly, Hillman's work has been an attempt to restore psyche to what he believes to be "its proper place" in psychology. Hillman sees the soul at work in imagination, fantasy, myth and metaphor. He also sees soul revealed in psychopathology, in the symptoms of psychological disorders. Psyche-pathos-logos is the "speech of the suffering soul" or the soul's suffering of meaning. A great portion of Hillman’s thought attempts to attend to the speech of the soul as it is revealed via images and fantasies.

Archetypal Psychology: A Brief Account (2006) was written in 1981 as a chapter in the Enciclopedia del Novecento in Italy and published by Hillman in 1983 as a basic introduction to his mythic psychology. It summarizes the major themes set out in his earlier, more comprehensive work, Re-Visioning Psychology (1975). The poetic basis of mind places psychological activities in the realm of images. It seeks to explore images rather than explain them. Within this is the idea that by re-working images, that is giving them attention and shaping and forming them until they are clear as possible then a therapeutic process which Hillman calls "soul making" takes place. Hillman equates the psyche with the soul and seeks to set out a psychology based without shame in art and culture. The goal is to draw soul into the world via the creative acts of the individual, not to exclude it in the name of social order. The potential for soulmaking is revealed by psychic images to which a person is drawn and apprehends in a meaningful way. Indeed, the act of being drawn to and looking deeper at the images presented creates meaning – that is, soul. Further to Hillman's project is a sense of the dream as the basic model of the psyche. This is set out more fully in The Dream and the Underworld (1979). In this text Hillman suggests that dreams show us as we are; diverse, taking very different roles, experiencing fragments of meaning that are always on the tip of consciousness. They also place us inside images, rather than placing images inside us. This move turns traditional epistemology on its head. The source of knowing is not Descartes' "I" but, rather, there is a world full of images that this 'I' inhabits. Hillman further suggests a new understanding of psychopathology. He stresses the importance of psychopathology to the human experience and replaces a medical understanding with a poetic one. In this idea, sickness is a vital part of the way the soul of a person, that illusive and subjective phenomenon, becomes known.

=== Dream analysis ===
Because archetypal psychology is concerned with fantasy, myth, and image, dreams are considered to be significant in relation to soul and soul-making. Hillman does not believe that dreams are simply random residue or flotsam from waking life (as advanced by physiologists), but neither does he believe that dreams are compensatory for the struggles of waking life, or are invested with “secret” meanings of how one should live, as did Jung. Rather, “dreams tell us where we are, not what to do” (1979). Therefore, Hillman is against the traditional interpretive methods of dream analysis. Hillman’s approach is phenomenological rather than analytic (which breaks the dream down into its constituent parts) and interpretive/hermeneutic (which may make a dream image “something other” than what it appears to be in the dream). His famous dictum with regard to dream content and process is “Stick with the image.”

For example, Hillman (1983a) discusses a patient's dream about a huge black snake. The dream work would include "keeping the snake" and describing it rather than making it something other than a snake. Hillman notes:

the moment you've defined the snake, interpreted it, you've lost the snake, you've stopped it and the person leaves the hour with a concept about my repressed sexuality or my cold black passions ... and you've lost the snake. The task of analysis is to keep the snake there, the black snake...see, the black snake's no longer necessary the moment it's been interpreted, and you don't need your dreams any more because they've been interpreted.

One would inquire more about the snake as it is presented in the dream by the psyche so to draw it forth from its lair in the unconscious. The snake is huge and black, but what else? Is it molting or shedding its skin? Is it sunning itself on a rock? Is it digesting its prey? This descriptive strategy keeps the image alive, in Hillman's opinion, and offers the possibility for understanding the psyche.

== The Soul's Code ==
Hillman's 1997 book, The Soul's Code: In Search of Character and Calling, outlines what he calls the "acorn theory" of the soul. This theory states that all people already hold the potential for the unique possibilities inside themselves, much as an acorn holds the pattern for an oak tree. The book describes how a unique, individual energy of the soul is contained within each human being, displayed throughout their lifetime and shown in their calling and life's work when it is fully actualized.

Hillman argues against the "nature and nurture" explanations of individual growth, suggesting a third kind of energy, the individual soul which is responsible for much of individual character, aspiration and achievement. He also argues against other environmental and external factors as being the sole determinants of individual growth, including the parental fallacy, dominant in psychoanalysis, whereby our parents are seen as crucial in determining who we are by supplying us with genetic material, conditioning, and behavioral patterns. While acknowledging the importance of external factors in the blossoming of the seed, he argues against attributing all of human individuality, character and achievement to these factors. The book suggests reconnection with the third, superior factor, in discovering our individual nature and in determining who we are and our life's calling.

Hillman suggests a reappraisal for each individual of their own childhood and present life to try to find their particular calling, the seed of their own acorn. He has written that he is to help precipitate a re-souling of the world in the space between rationality and psychology. He complements the notion of growing up, with the notion of growing down, or 'rooting in the earth' and becoming grounded, in order for the individual to further grow. Hillman incorporates logic and rational thought, as well as reference to case histories of well known people in society, whose daimons are considered to be clearly displayed and actualized, in the discussion of the daimon. His arguments are also considered to be in line with the puer aeternus or eternal youth whose brief burning existence could be seen in the work of romantic poets like Keats and Byron and in recently deceased young rock stars like Jeff Buckley or Kurt Cobain. Hillman also rejects causality as a defining framework and suggests in its place a shifting form of fate whereby events are not inevitable but bound to be expressed in some way dependent on the character of the soul of the individual. He also talked about the bad seed using Hitler, Charles Manson and other serial killers as examples.

== Criticism ==
From a classical Jungian perspective, Hillman's Archetypal Psychology is a contrarian school of thought, since he has applied Occam's razor to a few of what he refers to as unnecessary theoretical encumbrances of Jungian psychology. The term "archetypal" gives the impression that his school is based on Jung's understanding of the archetype. Yet, Walter Odajnyk argues that Hillman should have called his school "imaginal" psychology, since it is really based on Hillman's understanding of the imagination. Hillman has also rejected individuation, central to Jungian psychology. Wolfgang Giegerich argues that Hillman's work exists in a "bubble of irreality" outside time. It's a form of "static Platonism" impervious to developmental change. In Hillman's psychology, the "immunisation of the imaginal from the historical process has become inherent in its very form."

Hillman considers his work as an expression of the puer aeternus, the eternal youth of fairy tale who lives in an eternal dream-state, resistant to growing up. Yet, David Tacey maintains that denial of the maturational impulse will only lead to it happening anyway but in a negative form. He holds that Hillman's model was "unmade" by the missing developmental element of his thought: "By throwing out the heroic pattern of consciousness, and the idea of individuation, Hillman no longer appealed to most psychologists or therapists. By transgressing professional ethics, he no longer appealed to training institutes."

Marie-Louise von Franz regards identification with the puer aeternus as a neurosis belonging to the narcissistic spectrum. Against this, Hillman has argued that the puer is not under the sway of a mother complex but that it is best seen in relation to the senex or father archetype. However, Tacey says that the puer cannot be dissociated from the mother by intellectual reconfiguration. “If these figures are archetypally bound, why would intellectual trickery separate them?” The wrenching of the puer from the mother to the father is “a display of intellectual deceit, for a self-serving purpose.”

== Bibliography ==
- A Blue Fire - Selected Writings By James Hillman, Harper-perennial; Later Printing edition (2010). ISBN 0060161329
- City and Soul, Uniform Edition, Vol. 2 (Spring Publications, 2006). ISBN 0882145770
- Senex and Puer, Uniform Edition, Vol. 3 (Spring Publications, 2006). ISBN 0882149431
- Archetypal Psychology, Uniform Edition, Vol. 1 (Spring Publications, 2004. Original 1983.) ISBN 0882149970
- A Terrible Love of War, (2004). ISBN 0143034928
- The Force of Character, (Random House, New York, 1999). ISBN 0345424050
- The Soul's Code: In Search of Character and Calling, (1997). ISBN 0446673714
- Dream Animals, (with Margot McLean). (Chronicle Books, 1997) ISBN 0811813274
- Myths of the Family, (1997). Audio recording. January 1, 1997 by Sound Horizons Audio-Video. ISBN 9781879323551
- Opening the Dreamway in the Psyche of Robert Duncan, (1996) United States: Spring Publications ISBN 9781882670079
- Kinds of Power: A Guide to its Intelligent Uses, (1995). ISBN 0385469640
- Healing Fiction, (Spring Publications, 1994. Original 1983.) ISBN 9780930794552
- We've Had a Hundred Years of Psychotherapy – And the World's Getting Worse (with Michael Ventura), (1993). ISBN 9780062504098
- The Thought of the Heart and the Soul of the World, (1992)
- A Blue Fire: Selected Writings of James Hillman, introduced and edited by Thomas Moore, (1989)
- Anima: An Anatomy of a Personified Notion, (1985)
- Inter Views (with Laura Pozzo), (1983a)
- The Dream and the Underworld, (1979)
- Re-Visioning Psychology, (1975)
- Loose Ends: Primary Papers in Archetypal Psychology, (1975a)
- The Myth of Analysis: Three Essays in Archetypal Psychology, (1972)
- Pan and the Nightmare, (1972)
- Insearch:psychology and religion, (1967)
- Suicide and the Soul, (1964)
- Emotion; a comprehensive phenomenology of theories and their meanings for therapy, (1961)

== See also ==
- Wolfgang Giegerich
- Imaginal psychology
- Stanton Marlan
