= Stanton Marlan =

Stanton Marlan (born 1943) is an American clinical psychologist, Jungian psychoanalyst, author, and educator. Marlan has authored or edited scores of publications in Analytical Psychology (Jungian Psychology) and Archetypal Psychology. Three of his more well-known publications are The Black Sun. The Alchemy and Art of Darkness, C. G. Jung and the Alchemical Imagination, and Jung's Alchemical Philosophy. Marlan is also known for his polemics with German Jungian psychoanalyst Wolfgang Giegerich. Marlan co-founded the Pittsburgh Society of Jungian Analysts and was the first director and training coordinator of the C. G. Jung Institute Analyst Training Program of Pittsburgh. Currently, Marlan is in private practice and serves as adjunct professor of Clinical Psychology at Duquesne University, Pittsburgh, Pennsylvania, USA.

== Education and career ==
Marlan obtained a B.A. from Bard College and master's degrees in both Asian philosophy (University of Hawaii, 1968) and in psychology (New School for Social Research, now New School University, 1970). He later attended Duquesne University, obtaining a doctorate in clinical psychology in 1980 and a further doctorate in philosophy from Duquesne in 2014. Marlan's interests in philosophy include mainstream academic Continental European philosophy as well as various religious and spiritual traditions (both Eastern and Western). Esotericism, alchemy, and dreams are among Marlan's special interests.

Marlan began his training in Jungian psychoanalysis at the C. G. Jung Institute of New York, where he studied with well-known Jungian analysts and authors Edward Edinger and Edward Whitmont, among others. He later moved to Pittsburgh and became an early graduate of the Inter-Regional Society of Jungian Analysts (IRSJA), graduating as a Jungian analyst in 1980. Throughout these years of psychological and psychoanalytic training, Marlan held a number of clinical and academic positions.

After his graduation as a Jungian psychoanalyst in 1980, Marlan founded the C. G. Jung Institute Analytic Training Program of Pittsburgh, a training program in Jungian psychoanalysis associated with the IRSJA. A number of Jungian psychoanalysts who work in Pennsylvania, Ohio, and elsewhere have attended the Pittsburgh Institute Analytic Training Program and have graduated from the IRSJA. Marlan has continued to teach and periodically direct the training program he founded. In 2004, Marlan co-founded the Pittsburgh Society of Jungian Analysts, comprising a number of Jungian analysts residing mostly in Western Pennsylvania, Ohio, and Western New York.

Marlan holds a number of academic and professional positions, among them Teaching and Training Analyst for the Inter-Regional Society of Jungian Analysts and Adjunct Clinical Professor of Psychology and Clinical Supervisor at the Psychology Clinic at Duquesne University. He was formerly a Member of the board of directors and Past President of the American Board and Academy of Psychoanalysis (ABAP), a Representative for Psychoanalysis and Member on the board of trustees for Psychoanalysis for the American Board of Professional Psychology (ABPP), a Fellow of the American Board of Psychoanalysis (ABP), co-chair of the Psychoanalysis Synarchy Group for Council of Specialties in Professional Psychology, and a Member of the board of trustees of the Accreditation Council for Psychoanalytic Education (ACPE Inc.). Marlan is also active on a number of editorial boards for Jungian and psychoanalytic journals, including the editorial board of Spring Publications. He is a recent recipient of a Distinguished Service Award from American Board of Professional Psychology and the American Board and Academy of Psychoanalysis (2019). He was also a cofounder and the first president of the "Psychology-Psychoanalyst Forum," which has since become the “Psychoanalytic Clinicians,” Section 5 of the American Psychological Association’s Division 39.

Marlan’s interests in the human psyche extend beyond the typical limits of psychology and psychoanalysis, into areas of religion, spirituality, and the study of experimentation with psychedelics. Marlan is co-editor of The Encyclopedia of Psychology and Religion.

== Publications ==
Marlan has written and edited a number of books and articles, mostly within the disciplines of Jungian and Archetypal Psychologies. Two of the more well-known are the following.

Marlan’s book The Black Sun: The Alchemy and Art of Darkness explores darkness as a metaphor for negative psychological experiences, such as despair and depression. As a rule, Marlan maintains, Western psychology treats such “dark” experiences as purely negative, i.e. as experiences to be avoided or, at best, “gotten through,” rather than experienced and potentially valued on their own terms. In contrast, Marlan develops an understanding of these experiences of darkness which insists on their having psychological significance of their own and not only the relative value of being a step toward some other, more positive psychological stage. His analysis in some measure deconstructs the views of both standard Western psychology and standard Jungian psychological theory, by treating the darkness as a complement to Jung's notion of the “Self.” His investigation draws on a large variety of sources, including Jungian and Archetypal theory, clinical examples, literature, poetry, art, philosophy, and religious mysticism in order to highlight the value these experiences of “darkness” can have and how they can in principle serve the purposes of psychological growth and individuation. The text includes extended clinical examples illustrating the significance Marlan attributes to the darkness. The founder of Archetypal Psychology, James Hillman, wrote of The Black Sun that “Since Jung first opened the obscurities of alchemy to psychological insight, no one has done a book as thorough, as rich, and as significant as this astounding work by Stanton Marlan.”

The book Archetypal Psychologies: Reflections in Honor of James Hillman, edited by Marlan, was inspired by a conference in honor of James Hillman’s eightieth birthday. The volume is simultaneously an example of the broad interests and applications associated with Archetypal Psychology and a retrospective, offering a view of the historical events and achievements, particularly by Hillman and a number of those responsive to his new approach to psychology, which later developed into the tradition of Archetypal Psychology. The volume includes contributions from well-known Jungian and Archetypal psychologists and represents perhaps the broadest published application of Archetypal Psychology to date.

Marlan's more recent work has focused on what he calls the "alchemical imagination," especially found in his two books, C. G. Jung and the Alchemical Imagination and Jung's Alchemical Philosophy. Marlan's approach to alchemy in part takes up the alchemical studies of both Carl Jung and of James Hillman but especially underlines the value of alchemy for understanding and re-imagining the nature of depth psychology as a whole, counteracting certain tendencies toward literalism and essentialism in contemporary depth psychology. Marlan's interpretations both of the history of laboratory alchemy and of depth psychology elucidate aspects of each, highlighting the transformative character of the alchemists' pursuit of the philosophers' stone.

Marlan is also known for his polemics with Wolfgang Giegerich. Giegerich is an influential German psychologist and psychoanalyst. Like Marlan, Giegerich was a collaborator with James Hillman. At a later point in time, Giegerich developed his own psychological approach, partially borrowing from traditional depth psychology, Jung, and Hillman's Archetypal Psychology, but also from philosophers G. W. F. Hegel and Martin Heidegger. Giegerich's approach has become known as “psychology as the discipline of interiority.” Marlan, while appreciating Giegerich's approach, has also criticized Giegerich, in several cases provoking respectful responses from Giegerich. In particular, Marlan has argued that there is a certain range of phenomena which are relegated to a lower status by Giegerich's dialectical and logical approach to psychological life, which are nonetheless central to psychological life and to the work of analytical psychotherapy, such as images, dreams, and fantasy.

== Clinical approach ==
Marlan's publications suggest that his own clinical approach includes classical Jungian psychoanalysis and Archetypal psychology. However, Marlan's clinical writings also display distinctive nuances regarding clinical practice and technique.

Among the most important of these nuances is Marlan's recovery of the value of hesitation and slowness in analytic process. In his essay “Hesitation and Slowness: Gateway to Psyche’s Depth,” he highlights how classical psychoanalytical thinkers, including Sigmund Freud and Carl Jung, recognized the importance of allowing the psyche of one's patient to unfold in its own time, without pressure from the side of the analyst. For Marlan, the terms “hesitation” and “slowness” encompass a number of related ideas, including slow and careful (not active) listening on the part of the analyst, avoiding influencing the patient, allowing for the psyche of the patient to develop at its own pace and rhythm, and a certain amount of conscious reserve on the part of the analyst over and against the tendency to formulate material either too glibly or to reduce material to general theoretical precepts. Though he admits that there are times when spontaneous formulations are appropriate, Marlan suggests there is a tendency in the age of “industrialized” psychotherapy and under the pressures of managed care to move more quickly than the psyche's own tempo demands.

The Black Sun, summarized above, also includes specific clinical emphases related to the issue of hesitation and slowness. In particular, Marlan underlines a tendency both clinicians and patients can have to try to get through periods of darkness, depression, and despair as quickly as possible, rather than engaging with the darkness and drawing from those experiences their potential value for psychological growth and individuation. Even seemingly unbearable affects, Marlan maintains, can have important and profound meanings, which can be lost through attempting to speed through the difficult and uncomfortable feelings associated with the darkness.

Marlan's reading of Jung and of alchemy amplifies these points. In his essay “Jung and Alchemy: A Daimonic Reading,” Marlan differentiates his own study of Jung and of Jung's alchemical work from other approaches, especially those concerned with the historical and factual underpinnings of Jung's work and the historical and factual interpretation of alchemy. He states that "I do not read Jung for history, but for his-story… For me, reading Jung daimonically has meant a bracketing of my academic ego and letting myself be carried by fictions and gripped by an archetypal passion, a kind of madness that opens onto the scene of a magical adventure requiring an engagement not only with Jung and alchemy, but also my own psychic depths." This suggests that, just as his reading of Jung's alchemical studies is an act of imagination engendered by archetypal passion, so similarly such a passionate opening and expansion of imagination is a key element of individuation and thus essential to the practice of Jungian psychoanalysis. Such opening and expansion also require the patient to allow the seeds of psychic life to unfold at their own rate.

== Educator and lecturer ==
Marlan was an early graduate from the Inter-Regional Society of Jungian Analysts, an organization that was originally founded (1) to pool analytic resources of smaller Jungian training seminars, in order to aid each other in the work of analytic training and (2) to help smaller seminars grow into larger and, ultimately, independent training programs. Marlan founded the C. G. Jung Analyst Training Program of Pittsburgh in 1981 as a participating seminar of the Inter-Regional Society of Jungian Analysts and has both directed and taught in that program ever since. He was a Fay lecturer at Texas A&M University and has lectured widely at Jungian and Archetypal conferences in the United States and abroad, including the first International Conference on Jungian Analysis and Chinese Culture in Guangzhou, China, the IAAP International Congresses in Cambridge and Barcelona, and the first international conference of the Society for Psychology as the Discipline of Interiority in Berlin. He was a keynote speaker for the Guild of Pastoral Psychology held at Oxford University, for the Jung Society at the University of Toronto, and for the ARS Alchemica at Pacifica Graduate Institute, Santa Barbara, CA. He has taught at the C. G. Jung Institut-Zürich and at other at other training institutes and universities. Marlan is Adjunct Clinical Professor of Psychology at Duquesne University as well as Clinical Supervisor at Duquesne's Psychology Clinic, positions he has held for many years.

== Current projects ==
Among Marlan's current projects are the completion of two books, the first entitled, The Philosophers' Stone. Alchemy and the Art of Illumination and the second Revisioning Alchemy. James Hillman and the Colors of the Soul, the latter to be published by Spring Publications.

== Awards ==
Award from American Psychological Association, Division 39, Section V, in honor of being the Section's first President.

Nomination for the Gradiva Award (2006), issued by the National Association for the Advancement of Psychoanalysis, for creative contributions that advance psychoanalysis for The Black Sun. The Alchemy and Art of Darkness.

Distinguished Service Awards from American Board of Professional Psychology and the American Board and Academy of Psychoanalysis (2019).

Annual Book Prize awarded by the American Board of Professional Psychology and the American Board and Academy of Psychoanalysis (ABAPsa) for best theoretical book in Psychoanalysis in 2021, C. G. Jung and the Alchemical Imagination: Passages into the Mysteries of Psyche and Soul, Routledge.

Award for the Best Theoretical Book of 2022 from the International Association of Jungian Studies (IAJS) for Jung's Alchemical Philosophy. Psyche and the Mercurial Play of Image and Idea, Routledge.

== Selected publications ==
=== Authored and edited books ===
- Marlan, S. (ed.) (1995). Salt and the Alchemical Soul. Ernest Jones, Carl Jung, and James Hillman. New Orleans: Spring Publications.
- Marlan, S. (ed.) (1996). Fire in the Stone: The Alchemy of Desire. Asheville NC: Chiron Publications.
- Marlan, S. (2005). The Black Sun: The Alchemy and Art of Darkness, College Station: Texas A&M Press.
- Marlan, S. (ed.) (2008) Archetypal Psychologies: Reflections in honor of James Hillman. New Orleans: Spring Journal Books.
- Marlan, S. (2021). C. G. Jung and the Alchemical Imagination: Passages into the Mysteries of Psyche and Soul. New York: Routledge.
- Marlan, S. (2022). Jung's Alchemical Philosophy. Psyche and the Mercurial Play of Idea and Image. New York: Routledge.
- Leeming, D. A., Madden, K. W., & Marlan, S. (eds.) (2010). Encyclopedia of psychology and religion. New York: Springer.

=== Articles, book chapters, review essays ===
- Marlan, S. (1981). Depth Consciousness. In Valle, R. & Von Eckartsberg, R. (eds.) Metaphors of Consciousness. New York: Plenum Press.
- Marlan, S. (1986). The Wandering Uterus: Dream and the Pathologized Image. In Voices: The Art and Science of Psychotherapy (Journal of the American Academy of Psychotherapists), Vol. 21, Nos. 3 & 4. Reprinted in Gibson, K, Lathrop, D. & Stern, E. M. (eds.) (1986). Carl Jung and Soul Psychology. New York: Haworth Press.
- Marlan, S. (1989). A Blue Fire: The Work of James Hillman. In Psychologist Psychoanalyst, Official Publication of Division 39 of the American Psychological Association, vol. IX, no. 4.
- Marlan, S. & Trachtman, J. (1994). Section V, Psychologist-Psychoanalysts’ Forum: A History (1986–1991). In Lane, R. & Meisels, M. (eds.) A History of the Division of Psychoanalysis of the American Psychological Association. Hillsdale, NJ: Lawrence Erlbaum Associates.
- Marlan, S. & Pulver, T. (1994). A History of the Pittsburgh Association for the Theory and Practice of Psychoanalysis. In Lane, R. & Meisels, M. (eds.A History of the Division of Psychoanalysis of the American Psychological Association. Hillsdale, NJ: Lawrence Erlbaum Associates, 1994.
- Marlan, S. (1994). Dream Maps and the Multiple Intentionalities of Consciousness. In Churchill, S. (ed.) Methods. Dallas: University of Dallas Press.
- Marlan, S. (1996). Archetypal Psychology, Post-Modernism and the Symbolic Function. In Churchill, S. (ed.) Methods. Dallas: University of Dallas Press..
- Marlan, S. (1999). Jung in China: the First International Conference of Jungian Psychology and Chinese Culture, 1998. A personal account. The Round Table Review. Review: Contemporary Contributions to Jungian Psychology, Vol. 6, No. 4.
- Marlan, S. (2000). The Metaphor of Light and its Deconstruction in Jung's Alchemical Vision. In Brooke, R. (ed.) Pathways into the Jungian World. New York: Routledge.
- Marlan, S. (2001). The Metaphor of Light and Renewal in Taoist Alchemy and Jungian Analysis, Quadrant, Summer issue.
- Marlan, S. (2002). The Mixed Texture of Symbolic Thought: A Response to and Elaboration of Some Points in Alan Jones's Paper ‘Teleology and the Hermeneutics of Hope: Jungian Interpretation in Light of the Work of Paul Ricoeur. Journal of Jungian Theory and Practice. vol. 4, no. 2.
- Marlan, S. (2005). Hesitation and Slowness: Gateway to Psyche’s Depth. In The San Francisco Jung Institute Library Journal. vol. 24, no.1, February issue.
- Marlan, J. & Marlan, S. (2006). On the Etymology of ‘Festschrift’ and Other Imaginal Realities. In Downing, C. (ed.) Disturbances in the Field: Essays in Honor of David Miller. New Orleans: Spring Journal Books.
- Marlan, S. (2006). From the Black Sun to the Philosophers’ Stone, Spring Journal: A Journal of Archetype and Culture. Theme: Alchemy.
- Marlan, S. (2006). Alchemy. (Book Chapter) In Papadopoulos, R. (ed.) The Handbook of Jungian Psychology: Theory, Practice and Applications. New York: Routledge.
- Marlan, S. (2006). Edward Edinger. In Skelton, R. (ed,) The Edinburgh International Encyclopedia of Psychoanalysis, Edinburgh: Edinburgh University Press.
- Marlan, S. (2006). Ego/Self Axis. In Skelton, R. (ed,) The Edinburgh International Encyclopedia of Psychoanalysis, Edinburgh: Edinburgh University Press
- Marlan. S. (2007). Pre-texts of the Imaginal in the Hermetic Play of the Dream: The Ontotheology of Bean. Spring Journal: A Journal of Archetype and Culture. Themes: Philosophy & Psychology.
- Marlan. S. & Miller, D. (2007). What is the Legacy of the Dead: Jung's Memories and the Case of Zola's Missing Book. Spring Journal: A Journal of Archetype and Culture. Themes: Philosophy & Psychology.
- Marlan, S. (2008). Transference, Friendship and Other Mysteries: A Reverie. In Marlan, S. (ed.) Archetypal Psychologies: Reflections in Honor of James Hillman. New Orleans: Spring Journal Books.
- Marlan, S. (2008) Mystical Light: Dream Images and The Alchemy of Psychic Momentum. In Marlan, S. (ed.) Archetypal Psychologies: Reflections in Honor of James Hillman. New Orleans: Spring Journal Books.
- Marlan, S. (2009). Facing The Shadow. In Stein, M. (ed.) Jungian Psychoanalysis. Chicago: Open Court Publishers.
- Marlan, S. (2012). The Philosophers' Stone as Chaosmos: The Self and The Dilemma of Diversity. In Bennett, P. (ed.) Proceedings of the XV111th Congress of the International Association For Analytical Psychology, Montreal, August 2010, Einsiedeln: Daimon Verlag. Extended version: (2014) Jung Journal: Culture and Psyche. 2014
- Marlan, S. (2012). Foreword to Drob, S. Reading The Red Book: An Interpretive Guide To C. G. Jung's Liber Novus. New Orleans: Spring Journal Books.
- Marlan, S. (2013). Jung and Alchemy: a Daimonic Reading. In Kirsch, J. & Stein, M. (eds.) How and why we still read Jung. London: Routledge.
- Marlan, S. (2015). Abraxas and the Alchemy of Ice. In Sipiora, M. (ed.) Imagining Psychological Life: Philosophical, Psychological & Poetic Reflections – A Festschrift in Honor of Robert D. Romanyshyn, Ph.D.. Amherst NY: Trivium.
- Marlan, S. (2016). The Psychologist Who's Not a Psychologist: A Deconstructive Reading of Wolfgang Giegerich's Idea of Psychology Proper. Journal of Analytical Psychology. 61:2, 223–238.
- Marlan, S. (2016). The Absolute that is Not an Absolute: Alchemical Reflections on the Caput Mortuum, the Dark Other of Logical Light. International Journal of Jungian Studies.
- Marlan, S. (2017). My Dog that is Not My Dog: The Slippery Slope of PDI as a Method of Psychology. International Journal of Jungian Studies, 9(1):1-4.
- Marlan, S. (2017). The Azure Vault: Alchemy and the Cosmological Imagination. In Sardello, R. & Stroud, J. (eds.). Conversing with James Hillman: Alchemical Psychology. Dallas: The Dallas Institute of Humanities and Culture.
- Marlan, S. (2018). Divine Darkness and Divine Light: Alchemical Illumination and the Mystical Play Between Knowing and Unknowing. In Cattoi, T. & Odorisio, D. (eds.) Depth Psychology and Mysticism. New York: Palgrave.
- Marlan, S. (2019). What's the Matter—with Alchemical Recipes? Philosophy and Filth in the Forging of Jung's Alchemical Psychology. In Mills, J (ed,) Philosophizing Jung. New York: Routledge.
- Marlan, S. (In press). The Dark Animal, Wild and Illuminated: Animal Presences in Nature and Dream. In Sardello, R. & Stroud, J. (eds.) Conversing with James Hillman: Animal Presences. Dallas: The Dallas Institute of Humanities and Culture.
