= Wolfgang Giegerich =

German Jungian analyst

Wolfgang Giegerich (born 1942) is a German Jungian analyst. He was a practicing clinician for many years and has published books and articles on depth psychology since the mid-1970s.

== Biography ==
Wolfgang Giegerich was born in Wiesbaden, Hesse. He studied at the University of Würzburg and the University of Göttingen, and obtained his Ph.D. from the University of California at Berkeley. He received a Diploma from the C. G. Jung Institute–Zurich. After many years in private practice in Stuttgart and later in Wörthsee, near Munich, he now lives in Berlin. He has been a regular speaker at the Eranos conferences, and repeatedly taught as visiting professor at Kyoto University, Kyoto, Japan. He was on the faculty at Rutgers University from 1969 to 1972. He has lectured and taught in many countries (Germany, Switzerland, Austria, England, Italy, the US, Russia, Japan, and Brazil) and before many professional societies. His approximately 200 publications in the field of psychology, in several languages, include fourteen books. As a training analyst and supervisor, he currently writes, teaches, and works on publishing his collected English papers.

== Thought ==
The major goal of Giegerich's approach is to redefine the notion of psychology. Giegerich's perspective is influenced by the traditional depth psychologies of Sigmund Freud and Carl Jung, and more recently James Hillman’s archetypal psychology. Unlike both Sigmund Freud and Carl Jung, Giegerich argues that the methodology of the empirical sciences is an inadequate basis for the study of psychology. Rather, he draws on the phenomenology of Martin Heidegger, the notion of the dialectical movement of consciousness from G. W. F. Hegel, and like Jung, he uses various transformational ideas from medieval alchemy. Additionally, in contrast to modern academic psychology and to the various schools of psychotherapy, Giegerich argues for a shift in focus from the individual to “the soul".

In Giegerich's theory, the idea of soul does not function as some kind of objective or empirical substrate producing psychological phenomena. As Giegerich states, “There is no such thing as a soul that produces psychological phenomena. The phenomena have nothing behind them. They have everything they need within themselves, even their own origin, their author or subject. ‘The soul’ in my parlance thus does not refer to something real outside of, distinct from, and in addition to psychological phenomenology, but is no more than a still mythologizing, personifying, façon de parler, an expression for the inner soul quality, depth, and internal infinity, of the phenomena themselves as well as for their internal ‘teleology’.”.

=== Psychology as the discipline of interiority ===
Giegerich defines psychology as the discipline of interiority. Interiority, in this sense, refers to the ‘interior’ of the phenomena themselves. In this approach, there is no privileged content such as, for example, when Freud called dreams "the royal road to the unconscious" or as is common in Jungian psychology to privilege dreams, myths, fairy tales, and various other subjective phenomena. The only stipulation is that whatever the phenomenon under consideration is, that it be regarded from a psychological point of view, that is, as an expression of the soul, and that there is a "pressing urge for us to come to a binding commitment concerning its truth.”

=== The objective psyche and the soul ===
A key idea in this approach is the notion of the “objective psyche,” a term associated with Jung. Giegerich prefers the term soul, which means roughly the same thing. His preference for the word “soul” results from his seeing the term as carrying many of the subtle meanings and connotations from within the historical development of Western philosophy and psychology. Basically, this notion of the soul refers to the collective categories and structures of thought available to a particular culture at a particular time in history, and as such, it is the subject of psychology, in contrast to “personalistic psychology,” which is focused on the psychology that individual people have. As Giegerich says, “For a true psychology, only the soul, which is certainly undemonstrable, merely ‘metaphorical’ and for this reason a seeming nothing, can be the ‘substrate’ and subject of the phenomena. The human being is then their object; he or she is nothing but the place where soul shows itself, just like the world is the place where man shows himself and becomes active. We therefore must shift our standpoint away from ‘the human person’ to the ‘soul.’ ... I am talking of a shift of our standpoint, perspective, or the idea in terms of which we study, just as before, the concrete experience of individuals or peoples.” And it must be kept in mind that ultimately, it is the soul that frames the horizon for the “concrete experience of individuals or peoples.”

=== Methodology ===
As Giegerich says, “To do psychology, you have to have abstracted from your own thinking, to become able to dispassionately hear what the phenomena are saying and to let the thoughts as which they exist think themselves out, no matter where they will take you and without your butting in with your personal valuations and interests.” The idea of ‘thoughts thinking themselves’ is understood in terms of a Hegelian dialectic. Phenomena such as a dream, a symptom, or a cultural production are allowed to present themselves to consciousness, and often doing so through a series of positions and negations. Through iterations of this “dialectical analysis” the phenomenon, whatever it is, is revealed in its depth. Another way of saying it is that the phenomenon is hermeneutically “interiorized into itself,” through an examination of multiple layers of positions, negations and re-established positions. It is this kind of an analysis, in which thought penetrates ever more deeply into the logical structure of the matter at hand, which is Giegerich defines psychology as the “discipline of interiority.”

=== Psychotherapy ===
The soul appears in clinical practice in the autonomous form of “the third person of psychotherapy.” As Giegerich says, “[the soul] is no longer to be imagined as the individual property of each of the two other persons [in the consulting room, analyst and patient], but must be given independent reality. It is the world of complexes and archetypal images, of views and styles of consciousness, and thus it is also psychology itself, in the widest sense of the word, including all our ideas about the soul, its pathology and therapy, as well as our Weltanschauung.”

== Criticism ==
James Hillman, among the most accomplished and prolific post-Jungian writers remarked on (some of) the work Giegerich was engaged in prior to 1994: “Wolfgang Giegerich’s thought is the most important Jungian thought now going on—maybe the only consistent Jungian thought at all.” Hillman however qualified such praise by claiming that Giegerich's writings are also "vitiated with fallacies" of which Hillman elaborated three; 'the fallacy of historical models'; 'the ontological fallacy' and 'the fallacy of concretism'. Giegerich's work has also been controversial within the Jungian community, where the criticisms generally have been that his focus is too much on the intellect, that his writing style is unnecessarily opaque, and that it is difficult to relate his theory to the practice of psychotherapy. There is no documentation delineating the psychoanalytic efficacy of Giegerich's philosophical views in light of phenomena presenting for the clinical practice of psychology.

Giegerich is criticised as dismissive of the role of emotion plays in generating interest in logical process, thinking and doctrine, and also for conflating "emotion" or "affect" with Jung's definition of "feelings" whilst summarily dismissing all three from any consideration of their influence in the dialectical process. Whilst Giegerich appeals to Jung's definition of feeling as an "ego function" that negatively interferes with objective thought, he fails to elaborate on the role of physiological affect which, by contrast to Jung's feeling-function, is not an ego function and which nevertheless accompanies the human organism at all times in the form of moods that shape perceptions and influence logic in a way that cannot be simply dismissed as Giegerich recommends. Critics have stated that Giegerich's recommendations to "rise above" or to "be free of" emotions amount to the promotion of lack of emotional awareness and outright disaffectation in Joyce McDougall's sense of the term. He has responded to a few of these criticisms in his writings, but not all.

== Works ==
=== The Collected English Papers of Wolfgang Giegerich ===
- The Collected English Papers of Wolfgang Giegerich, Vol. 1: The Neurosis of Psychology: Primary Papers toward a Critical Psychology. New Orleans: Spring Journal Books, 2005; Routledge, 2020. ISBN 9780367485351
- The Collected English Papers of Wolfgang Giegerich, Vol. 2: Technology and the Soul: From the Nuclear bomb to the World Wide Web. New Orleans: Spring Journal Books, 2007; Routledge, 2020. ISBN 9780367485337
- The Collected English Papers of Wolfgang Giegerich, Vol. 3: Soul-Violence. New Orleans: Spring Journal Books, 2008; Routledge, 2020. ISBN 9780367485306
- The Collected English Papers of Wolfgang Giegerich, Vol. 4: The Soul Always Thinks. New Orleans: Spring Journal Books, 2010; Routledge, 2020. ISBN 9780367485269
- The Collected English Papers of Wolfgang Giegerich, Vol. 5: The Flight into the Unconscious: An analysis of C.G. Jung's psychology project. New Orleans: Spring Journal Books, 2013; Routledge, 2020. ISBN 9780367485207
- The Collected English Papers of Wolfgang Giegerich, Vol. 6: Dreaming the Myth Onwards: C.G. Jung on Christianity and on Hegel. Part 2 of The Flight into the Unconscious. New Orleans: Spring Journal Books, 2014; Routledge, 2020. ISBN 9780367485160
- The Collected English Papers of Wolfgang Giegerich, Vol. 7: How to Think Psychologically: With Jung Beyond Jung. Routledge, 2025. ISBN 9781041007357
- The Collected English Papers of Wolfgang Giegerich, Vol. 8: Sharpening Psychology's Concepts: The Spirit of Jungian Psychology and the Danger of Faulty Thinking. Routledge, 2025. ISBN 9781041007395

=== Partial bibliography ===
- Giegerich, Wolfgang. The Soul’s Logical Life. Frankfurt am Main: Peter Lang, 2001.
- Giegerich, Wolfgang. “The End of Meaning and the Birth of Man,” Journal of Jungian Theory and Practice 6(1), 2004, 1-66. (This article is available on the Web. See the external links below.)
- Giegerich, Wolfgang, David L. Miller, & Greg Mogenson. Dialectics and Analytical Psychology: The El Capitan Canyon Seminar. New Orleans: Spring Journal Books. 2005.
- Giegerich, Wolfgang. “Love the Questions Themselves,” an interview with Robert Henderson in Living with Jung: “Enterviews” with Jungian Analysts, Vol. 3, (Robert & Janis Henderson, eds.) Spring Journal Books, New Orleans: 2010.
- Giegerich, Wolfgang. What is Soul?, New Orleans: Spring Journal Books, 2012.
- Giegerich, Wolfgang. Neurosis: The Logic of a Metaphysical Illness, New Orleans: Spring Journal Books, 2013.
- Giegerich, Wolfgang. Pitfalls in Comparing Buddhist and Western Psychology: A contribution to psychology's self-clarification, Createspace Independent Publishing Platform, 2018.
- Giegerich, Wolfgang. Working with Dreams: Initiation into the Soul’s Speaking About Itself, Routledge, 2020.
- Giegerich, Wolfgang. What Are the Factors That Heal?, Dusk Owl Books, 2020.
- Giegerich, Wolfgang. Coniunctio: Reflexions on a key concept of C.G. Jungʼs psychology, Dusk Owl Books, 2021.
- Giegerich, Wolfgang. Hope, Dusk Owl Books, 2024.
- Giegerich, Wolfgang. The Difference Between Western and Zen-Buddhist Thinking: A Western Commentary on Masao Abe's “The Self in Jung and Zen”, Dusk Owl Bookes, 2025.
- Giegerich, Wolfgang. The Airtight Construction of a Neurosis, the Logic of Modernity, and the Mother of Psychology: On Marco Heleno Barreto’s analysis of Giegerich’s psychology as the discipline of interiority. Dusk Owl Books, 2026.
