= Joie Davidow =

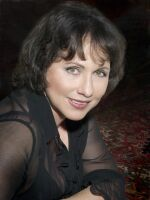
- Born: Philadelphia, Pennsylvania, U.S.
- Education: University of Pennsylvania (BA); New England Conservatory of Music (Master of Music)
- Occupations: Author, Editor
- Known for: co-founder of LA Weekly

Joie Davidow is an author and editor best known as co-founder of LA Weekly and L.A. Style magazines, and for her memoir Marked for Life.

== Early life and education ==
Davidow was born in Philadelphia, United States, to a Romanian Jewish mother and Russian Jewish father. She grew up in the small town of Millville, New Jersey, where both her parents were lawyers. She has two siblings: Jacqueline and Julianne Davidow.

She graduated from the University of Pennsylvania with a major in music, then earned a Master of Music degree from the New England Conservatory. Aspiring to be an opera singer, she went to Rome, Italy to study with Maestro Luigi Ricci, at that time in his 90s, who was a coach at the Opera di Roma when Puccini premiered his operas there.

== Los Angeles ==
Davidow moved to Los Angeles, where in 1978 she co-founded the alternative weekly newspaper, LA Weekly, with Jay Levin, a former investigative reporter for the New York Post whom she had known in New York.

In 1985, on the heels of the success of the L.A. Weekly, she founded a spin-off monthly magazine, L.A. Style, chronicling the aesthetic of Los Angeles, from fashion, interior design and architecture to food and travel. In 1988, L.A.Style was sold to American Express Publishing. Unhappy with the corporate conversion of what had been an independent publication, Davidow resigned her position as executive publisher and editor-in-chief in January 1992. The magazine folded nine months later.

In 1995, with colleague Eileen Rosaly, Davidow founded Sí magazine, catering to English-speaking Americans of Latino descent. However, major advertisers remained unconvinced that the Latino market was significant, and the magazine folded in 1997. Davidow subsequently teamed with author Esmeralda Santiago to edit two volumes of memoir, Las Christmas: Favorite Latino Authors Share Their Holiday Memories and Las Mamis: Favorite Latino Authors Remember their Mothers (both published by Vintage), featuring the work of the many authors who were featured in Sí magazine.

== Italy ==
Davidow spent part of 2000–2001 in Rome, Italy, completing her memoir, Marked for Life, a memoir about living with a facial port wine stain, which was published by Harmony in 2003.

With Esmeralda Santiago, she edited two story anthologies, Las Mamis and Las Christmas (published by Vintage). She is also the author of Infusions of Healing: A Treasury of Mexican-American Healing (published by Fireside). Her historical novel, An Unofficial Marriage, the story of the indomitable love of the Russian author Ivan Turgenev for opera singer Pauline Viardot, was published by Arcade, March 2021.

In 2005, she moved to Rome, where, with colleague Vikki Ericks, she founded the weekly online magazine In Rome Now: Beyond the Guidebooks (InRomeNow.com).

Davidow makes her home in Umbria, Italy, where she teaches creative writing workshops and works as a freelance book editor.

== Books ==
- — (2023). Anything But Yes: A Novel of Anna Del Monte, Jewish Citizen of Rome, 1749. Monkfish. ISBN 1-4363-1186-1.
- — (2021). An Unofficial Marriage: A Novel about Pauline Viardot and Ivan Turgenev. Arcade. ISBN 978-1950691784.
- — (2008). I Wouldn't Leave Rome to Go to Heaven. Xlibris Corporation LLC. ISBN 1-4363-1186-1.
- — (2003). Marked for Life. Harmony. ISBN 978-1-4000-4741-3.
- —; Santiago, Esmeralda (2000). Las Mamis: Favorite Latino Authors Remember their Mothers. Knopf. ISBN 978-0-375-40879-3.
- — (1999). Infusions of Healing. Fireside. ISBN 978-0-684-85416-8.
- —; Santiago, Esmeralda (1998). Las Christmas: Favorite Latino Authors Share Their Holiday Memories. Knopf. ISBN 978-0-375-40151-0.
