= We've Had a Hundred Years of Psychotherapy – and the World's Getting Worse =

Book by James Hillman

- Authors: James Hillman; Michael Ventura
- Language: English
- Subject: Psychotherapy
- Publisher: HarperCollins
- Publication date: 1992
- Publication place: United States
- Media type: Print (Hardcover and Paperback)
- Pages: 242
- ISBN: 0-06-250409-6
- OCLC: 24952969
- Dewey Decimal: 150/.1 20
- LC Class: RC437.5 .H55 1992

We've Had a Hundred Years of Psychotherapy – and the World's Getting Worse is a 1992 book by American psychologist James Hillman and American writer and commentator Michael Ventura.

The book has a three-part structure. The first section is in the form of a free-floating dialogue between Hillman and Ventura. The second section consists of lengthier essays written by the two authors to each other. The third section returns to the dialogue format of the first.

The two authors agree that psychotherapy, as it is currently conceived, is inadequate to deal with modern anxieties and neuroses.
