= V. Walter Odajnyk =

Jungian analyst and author

Volodymyr Walter Odajnyk (April 10, 1938 – May 22, 2013), known professionally as V. Walter Odajnyk, was a Jungian analyst, author and university professor.

== Life and career ==
=== Early years ===
Volodymyr Walter Odajnyk was born in Ostrava, Czechoslovakia, of Ukrainian parents. Surviving the war, the peace became uneasy. Several months after the Communist coup d'état in 1948, they left Czechoslovakia with the aid of the U. S. Army. After a year in Austria, they arrived in the United States.

In 1961, at Hunter College in New York, he obtained his B.A., followed by an M.A. at the University of California, Berkeley in 1963. He specialized in political science and philosophy. In 1965 his thesis was published, Marxism and Existentialism. It discusses Jean-Paul Sartre and contains a chapter on his then-recent work, Critique de la raison dialectique (1960).

In 1970, Odajnyk obtained his Ph.D. in Political Science from Columbia University in New York. For five years he was first a lecturer, then an Assistant Professor of Political Science at Columbia. In 1972 he spoke at Harvard University on foreign policy, criticizing the Soviet policy on Ukraine.

=== Work in psychology ===
His 1976 book Jung and Politics grew out of his March 1973 article in the American Political Science Review. A stance attributed to him, characterized as asserting that political theory is largely subsumed by psychological elements, was criticized. Marie-Louise von Franz wrote the book's foreword. Ojadnyk has chapters on the origin of culture, distortions due to psychic inflation, era of mass society, the individual, and role of the unconscious. Attention is given to the German case. In his comparative discussion of Jung and Freud (pp. 134-181), he mentions Reich, also Marcuse, Adorno, Fromm.

His Jungian analyst diploma in 1976 was from the C. G. Jung Institute, Zürich. He then practiced as an analyst in New York City. He served, at the C. G. Jung Institute of New York, on the faculty and as a board member. He co-edited Quadrant: Journal of the C.G. Jung Foundation for Analytical Psychology.

His 1993 book Gathering the Light explores Jungian understandings of meditation. It addressed Jung's uneasiness about a direct adoption by the west of eastern practices, without adequately contextualizing the approach. Separate chapters discuss the meditation experience, Zen practice, and compare them with Alchemy; also compared: western mysticism and Active Imagination. For the stages of Zazen, Odajnyk follows the well-known Ox and Herder illustrations. Appendices critique Ken Wilber on archetypes and Thomas Cleary on The Secret of the Golden Flower.

From 2002 to 2013 Dr. Odajnyk was a core faculty member of the Mythological Studies Program, at the Pacifica Graduate Institute in Santa Barbara, California. He became licensed as a research psychoanalyst by the Medical Board of California. He was also a supervising analyst associated with the C.G. Jung Study Center of Southern California.

In his 2012 book Archetype and Character, he presented several innovative understandings. He built on foundations begun by Jung in his Psychological Types (1921), and in his prior manuscript (1913-1917) published later as The Red Book (2009).

During his last years he was especially interested in Egyptian mythology. For example, in working to explicate the ancient lore of Isis and Osiris, he included an alchemical process for the creation of the diamond body, graced with immortality.

=== Family, Memorial ===
He was survived by his wife Katherine Odesmith, and son Alex.

A memorial scholarship was established at Pacifica in his honor.

== Books, articles ==
- Marxism and Existentialism (Doubleday Anchor 1965)
- Jung and Politics. The Political and Social Ideas of C.G. Jung (New York University & Harper 1976, reprint iUniverse 2007)
- Gathering the Light. A psychology of meditation (Shambhala 1993, reprint Fisher King 2011)
- Archetype and Character. Power, Eros, Spirit, and Matter. Personality Types (Palgrave Macmillan 2012)

- "The political ideas of C. G. Jung", in American Political Science Review, v.67, n.1 (March 1973). Accessed 31-10-2020.
- "Gathering the Light. A Jungian exploration of the psychology of meditation", in Quadrant, v.21, n.1 (1988)
- "Meditation and Alchemy. Images of the Goal in East and West", in Psychological Perspectives, issue 22 (Spring 1990)
- "Zazen. A psychological exploration", in Psychological Perspectives, v.25 (Fall-Winter 1991)
- "Zen meditation as a way of individuation and healing", in Psychological Perspectives, v.37/1 (1998)
- "Archetypal interpretation of fairy tales: Bluebeard", in Psychological Perspectives, v.47/2 (2004)
- "The Red Book as the source of Jung's Psychological Types", in Psychological Perspectives, v.56/3 (2013), posthumous. Accessed 1-11-2020.
