= Susan Piver =

American writer and meditation teacher

Susan Piver is an American writer and meditation teacher.

== Life ==
Susan Piver has been a student of Buddhism since 1995 and writes books based on Buddhistic teachings and ideas. She has taught meditation since 2005. Her publications have made it into the New York Times Bestseller lists. Her latest book is The Four Noble Truths of Love: Buddhist Wisdom for Modern Relationships. In 2011 she launched the Open Heart Project, an online mindfulness community with close to 20,000 members.

== Awards ==
- 2007: Books For A Better Life Award for the Book How Not to Be Afraid of Your Own Life

== Works (selection) ==
- The Four Noble Truths of Love: Buddhist Wisdom for Modern Relationships, 2018
- Start Here Now: An Open-Hearted Guide to the Path and Practice of Meditation, 2015
- The Wisdom of a Broken Heart, 2009
- Quiet Mind: A Beginner's Guide to Meditation, 2008
- How Not to Be Afraid of Your Own Life, 2007
- The Hard Questions for an Authentic Life: 100 Essential Questions for Tapping into Your Inner Wisdom, 2004
- The Hard Questions For Adult Children and Their Aging Parents, 2004
- The Hard Questions: 100 Essential Questions to Ask Before You Say I Do, 2000
