= Thomas Moore (spiritual writer) =

American psychotherapist

- Born: October 8, 1940 (age 85); Detroit, Michigan
- Education: DePaul University (B.A.); University of Michigan (M.A.); University of Windsor (M.A.); Syracuse University (Ph.D.)
- Occupation: Psychotherapist
- Notable work: Care of the Soul (1992)
- Spouse: Hari Kirin (born Joan Hanley)
- Children: 2
- Website: thomasmooresoul.com

Thomas Moore (born October 8, 1940, in Detroit, Michigan) is an American psychotherapist, former monk, and writer of popular spiritual books, including the New York Times bestseller Care of the Soul (1992), a "guide to cultivating depth and sacredness in everyday life". He writes and lectures in the fields of archetypal psychology, mythology, and imagination. His work is influenced by the writings of Carl Jung and James Hillman.

== Early life and education ==
Moore was born to an Irish Catholic family in Detroit, Michigan. At age 13, he joined the prep seminary of the Servites, a Roman Catholic lay order, where he studied philosophy and music. However, he left the order 13 years later, rather than becoming an ordained priest.

Moore earned a B.A. from DePaul University in Chicago, an M.A. in musicology from the University of Michigan, an M.A. in theology from the University of Windsor, Ontario, and in 1975, a Ph.D. in religion from Syracuse University. He taught at Glassboro State College and then Southern Methodist University. Denial of tenure at SMU launched Moore's next career.

== Career ==
From 1974 to 1990, Moore practiced as a psychotherapist, first in Dallas, Texas, and later in New England. After the success of Care of the Soul: Guide for Cultivating Depth and Sacredness in Everyday Life (1992) and its companion volume Soul Mates: Honoring the Mysteries of Love and Relationship (1994), he became a full-time writer who lectures internationally about spirituality, ecology, psychotherapy, and religion. He is also a columnist with The Huffington Post, and Spirituality & Health Magazine and Beliefnet.

== Personal life ==
He lives in New Hampshire with his wife, the artist Hari Kirin (born Joan Hanley), whom he met at Lesley College, where she was a student in his art therapy class. They have two children.

== Bibliography ==
=== Books ===
- The Planets Within: Ficino's Astrological Psychology. Bucknell University Press. 1982. ISBN 978-0-83875-022-3
- Rituals of the imagination. 2nd edition. Dallas: Dallas Institute of Humanities and Culture. 1984. ISBN 0-911005-03-X.
- Care of the Soul: Guide for Cultivating Depth and Sacredness in Everyday Life. HarperCollins. 1992. ISBN 978-0-06-183534-6.
- Soul Mates: Honoring the Mystery of Love and Relationship. 1994. ISBN 0060169281.
- Meditations: On the Monk Who Dwells in Daily Life. New York: HarperCollins Publishers. 1994. ISBN 0-06-017223-1.
- The Re-enchantment of Everyday Life. 1997. ISBN 0060928247.
- The Education of the Heart. Harper Perennial. 1997. ISBN 0-06-092860-3.
- Dark Eros: The Imagination of Sadism. 1998. ISBN 0882143654.
- The Soul of Sex: Cultivating Life as an Act of Love. 1999. ISBN 0060930950.
- Original Self: Living with Paradox and Originality. Harper. 2000. ISBN 0-06-019542-8.
- The Soul's Religion: Cultivating a Profoundly Spiritual Way of Life. Harper. 2002. ISBN 0-06-019286-0.
- Dark Nights of the Soul: A Guide to Finding Your Way Through Life's Ordeals. Gotham. 2004. ISBN 1-59240-067-1.
- A Life at Work: The Joy of Discovering What You were Born to Do. 2008. ISBN 0767922530.
- Writing in the Sand: Jesus, Spirituality and the Soul of the Gospels. Hay House. 2009. ISBN 978-1-4019-2413-3.
- Care of the Soul in Medicine. Hay House. 2010. ISBN 978-1-4019-2563-5.
- The Guru of Golf. 2010. ISBN 1401925669.
- A Religion of One's Own: A Guide to Creating a Personal Spirituality in a Secular World. Gotham. 2014. ISBN 978-1-59240-829-0.
- The Soul of Christmas. Franciscan Media. 2016. ISBN 1632531208.
- Ageless Soul: The Lifelong Journey Toward Meaning and Joy. St. Martin's. 2017. ISBN 978-1-250-13581-0.
- Soul Therapy: The Art and Craft of Caring Conversations. HarperCollins. 2021. ISBN 9780063071438.

=== Articles ===
- Moore, Thomas (Jan–Feb 2013). "The author of your life's story". Care of the Soul. Spirituality & Health. 15 (6): 14–15.

== See also ==
- Analytical psychology
- Carl Jung
- James Hillman
