= Patrick Range McDonald =

American journalist and author

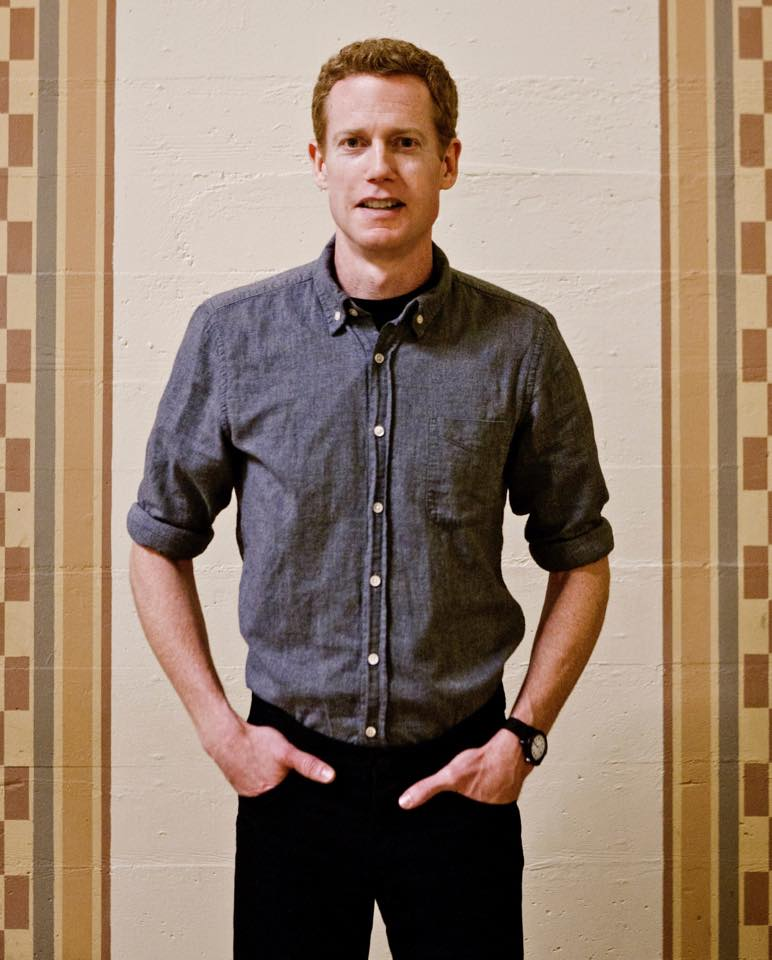

Patrick Range McDonald is an American author and journalist. As a staff writer at L.A. Weekly, he won the Los Angeles Press Club's "Journalist of the Year" award and the "Public Service" award from the Association of Alternative Newsmedia.

McDonald also co-wrote former Los Angeles Mayor Richard Riordan's memoir, The Mayor: How I Turned Around Los Angeles after Riots, an Earthquake, and the OJ Simpson Murder Trial. The book was a New York Times and Los Angeles Times best seller.

And he wrote a book about Los Angeles–based AIDS Healthcare Foundation, the world's largest HIV/AIDS medical-care nonprofit that operates in 45 countries and serves more than 1.6 million patients. The book is titled Righteous Rebels: AIDS Healthcare Foundation's Crusade to Change the World. In a review, The Lancet, the global health journal, noted: "McDonald has managed a deft balancing act with this book: on one hand providing a fascinating inside view of a billion-dollar non-profit organisation, while on the other hand providing a history of both the AIDS Healthcare Foundation and the AIDS crisis, full of human interest and compelling portraits of the major players in the organisation."

McDonald was later the historical consultant for Keeping the Promise: AHF 30 Years, a documentary narrated by actress Meryl Streep.

He is currently the advocacy journalist for Housing Is A Human Right, the housing advocacy division of AIDS Healthcare Foundation and one of the leading housing justice organizations in the United States. His work there earned him the "Best Activism Journalism" award from the Los Angeles Press Club. In 2022, McDonald wrote a short book, Selling Off California: The Untold Story, about the powerful alliances and devastating policies that fuel the housing affordability and homelessness crises in California. It was a finalist for a Los Angeles Press Club award. He was born in Newark, New Jersey.
