= Jay Levin =

American journalist

- Born: 1943 (age 82–83); New York City; United States
- Occupations: Newspaper editor, writer, entrepreneur
- Known for: LA Weekly

Jay Levin is an American journalist who was co-founder and editor of the LA Weekly, one of the seminal newspapers of the weekly alternative press in the United States, until 1992.

== Biography ==
=== Early life ===
Levin was born in New York, the son of a tool and die maker.

=== LA Weekly ===
Jay Levin is best known as the co-founder of the LA Weekly, of which he was editor-in-chief and president for many years before selling what his team had grown to be the largest and most successful city weekly in the country. Levin put together an investment group that included actor Michael Douglas, Burt Kleiner, Joe Benadon and Pete Kameron. Levin retained many of the writers he had earlier brought to the Los Angeles Free Press and hired Joie Davidow to edit the arts and entertainment section. The publication's first issue featured a group of female comedians, including the then-little known Sandra Bernhard, on its cover. Subsequent issues featured exposés on the Los Angeles basin's air quality and U.S. interventionism in Central America. The LA Weekly was also notable for its coverage of independent cinema and the Los Angeles music scene. Davidow produced a comprehensive calendar section and explored undiscovered fashion districts, discovering new designers.

In 1985, the LA Weekly launched a glossy magazine, L.A. Style, which Davidow edited. L.A. Style was sold to American Express Publishing in 1988 and merged with BUZZ magazine in 1993.

By 1990, the LA Weekly achieved a circulation of 165,000, making it the largest urban weekly in the U.S.

=== Post-LA Weekly ===
Levin stepped down as president of the LA Weekly in 1992 in order to found a progressive cable TV network and was succeeded by Michael Sigman as publisher and Kit Rachlis as editor. The newspaper was sold to Stern Publishing, owner of the Village Voice, in 1994; in October 2005, it was sold to the Phoenix, Arizona-based Village Voice Media. In September 2012, it was transferred to the Denver-based Voice Media Group in a management buyout.

Levin founded the start-up progressive channel, Planet Central TV, and later a website and magazine called Real Talk L.A.

=== Recent career ===
From 1999 until 2016 Levin split his time between starting, growing or turning around media properties such as TheFix.com; and part-time on life coaching focused on teaching life mastery and helping people reorient their lives, careers and relationships without spending years in therapy. Over those years Levin also began offering courses to hundreds of people in Life Elevation, relationships and leadership.
