= Oneironautics =

Consciously travelling within a dream

Oneironautics (/əneɪroʊˈnɔːtɪks/) refers to the ability to travel within a dream on a conscious basis. Such a traveler in a dream may be called an oneironaut.

== Within one's dream ==
A lucid dream is one in which the dreamer is aware that they are dreaming. They are able to exert some or a complete control over the dream's characters, narrative and/or environment. Early references to the phenomenon are found in ancient Greek texts.

== Within the dream of another ==
The idea of one person being able to consciously travel or interact within the dream of another person, known variously as "dream telepathy", "telepathic lucid dreaming", or "telepathic dreaming", has been explored in the realms of science and fantasy fiction; in recent works, such an interaction is often depicted as a computer-mediated psychotherapeutic action, as is the case in The Cell, and Paprika, as well as through the direct intervention of another sleeping person, as in Inception, Dreamscape, and Waking Life. The concept is also included in the fantasy series The Wheel of Time as an ability "dreamwalkers" are able to use.

A trope in such works of fiction explores the ramifications of whether the sleeping protagonist should enter the sleeping brain of another as opposed to allowing another individual to enter one's own brain; the entering of another individual's brain often results in unpleasant surprises, depending upon the mental state of the host or the preparedness of the guest. Roger Zelazny's 1966 sci-fi novella The Dream Master, which applies computer-mediated dream telepathy in a psychotherapeutic setting, focuses on the protagonist's growing struggle to keep his balance as he enters the brain of a fellow psychotherapist who is blind, and subconsciously destructively hungers for the visual stimuli upon which dreams largely depend.

== See also ==
- Astral projection
- Dreaming (journal)
- Dreams in analytical psychology
- Dreamwork
- Embodied imagination
- International Association for the Study of Dreams (IASD)
- Lucid dreaming
- Oneirology
- Oneiromancy
- Psychonautics
- Simstim – a technology in William Gibson's Sprawl trilogy of science fiction novels, whereby a person's brain and nervous system is stimulated to simulate the full sensory experience of another person
- Unconscious mind
