= Dreams in analytical psychology =

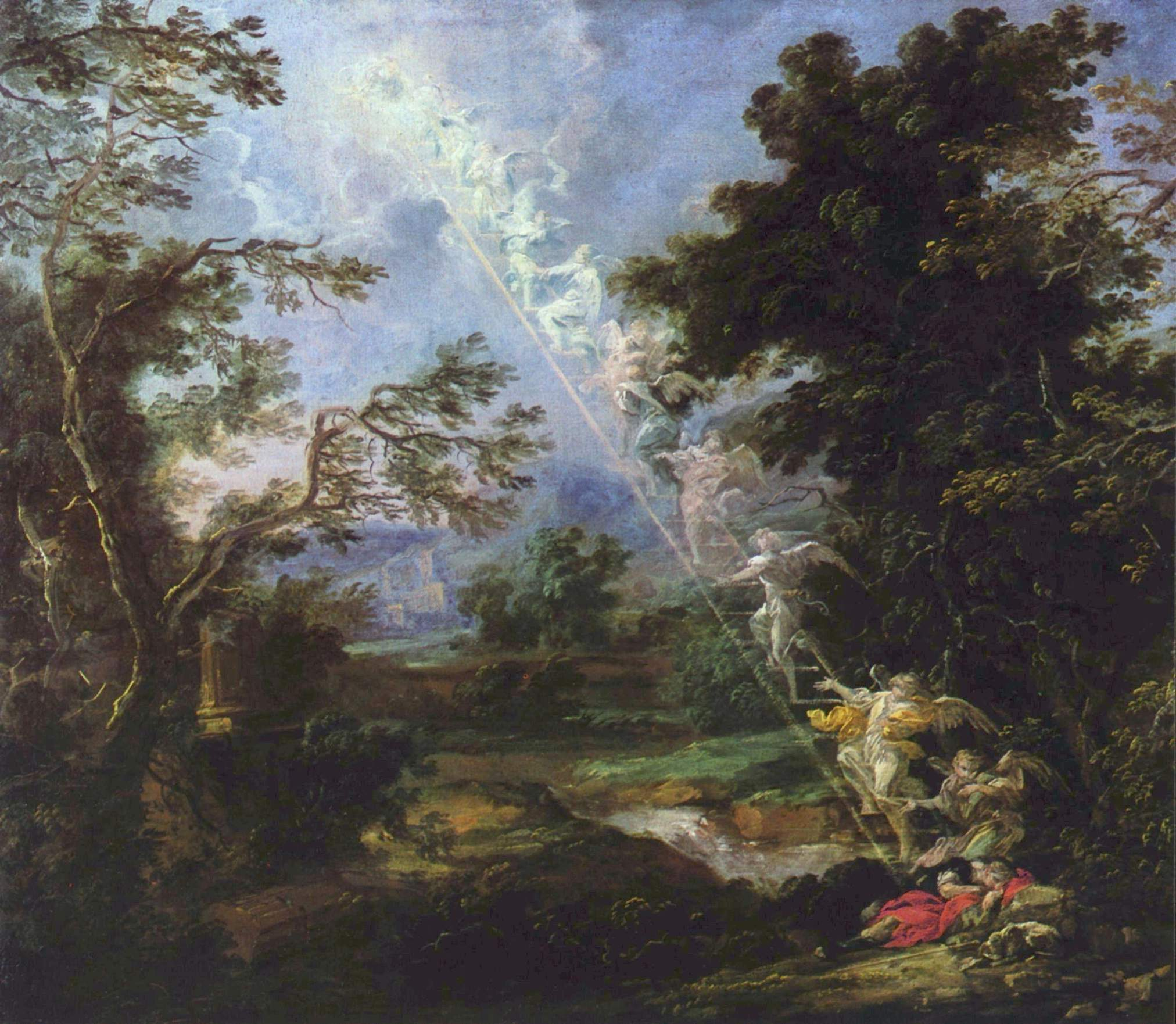
Michael Lukas Leopold Willmann, Jacob's Dream Landscape, circa 1691.

Dream psychology is a scientific research field in psychology. In analytical psychology, as in psychoanalysis generally, dreams are "the royal road" to understanding unconscious content. (Note: Entry "Rêve (interprétation du -)" by Roger Perron, p. 1472, Vol. II.)

However, for Swiss psychiatrist Carl Jung, its interpretation and function in the psyche differ from the Freudian perspective. Jung explains that "the general function of dreams is to try to re-establish our psychological equilibrium by means of dream material which, in a subtle way, reconstitutes the total equilibrium of our entire psyche. This is what [he] calls the complementary (or compensatory) function of dreams in our psychic constitution". (Note: L'Homme et ses symboles, Robert Laffont, 1964, p 49.) In this sense, dreams play a part in the development of the personality, at the same time as linking the subject to the vast imaginary reservoir that is the collective unconscious. According to analyst Thomas B. Kirsch, "Jung regards the dream as a natural and normal psychic phenomenon, which describes the dreamer's inner situation [and makes it a] spontaneous self-portrait, in symbolic form, of the present state of his unconscious". (Note: p. 1472.)

Jung and his followers, such as Marie Louise von Franz (for whom dreams are "the voice of human instinct") and James Hillman, made a significant contribution to the science of dreams. Carl Gustav Jung proposed a dual reading of the dream in terms of object and subject, while representing the dream as a dramatic process with phases that shed light on its meaning, always individual but also reducible to cultural and universal issues. His method of interpretation, "amplification", allows us to compare dream messages with myths and cultural productions from all eras. Marie Louise von Franz has studied dream symbols, while James Hillman is more interested in what this other world represents for the dreamer.

As a nocturnal theater of symbols, dreams are for Jung a natural production of the unconscious, (Note: "Just as a plant produces flowers, the psyche creates its symbols. Every dream bears witness to this process", in L'Homme et ses symboles, Robert Laffont, 1964, p. 64.) as well as the locus of personality transformation and the path to what Jung calls "individuation". The dream is therefore at the heart of Jungian psychotherapy, which aims, through its study and the method of amplification, to relate each dream motif to the human imagination, and thus develop its meaning for the dreamer.

== Dreams in analytical psychology ==
In analytical psychology, the dream is a natural process emanating from the unconscious. As such, it has several functions, which Jung explores in two major works: Man's Discovery of His Soul (Note: Book III, "Dreams", pp. 193-337, is a synthetic introduction to Jung's thinking on the dream process.) and On the Interpretation of Dreams. (Note: This book brings together Jung's seminar notes on dream analysis from 1936 to 1941.) According to Jacques Montanger, for Jung, the dream is "an organ of information and control with a dual function": a compensatory and a prospective function, as well as being a physiological regulator.

=== Physiological function ===
In his early writings on dreams, Jung considered the biological and physiological utility of dreams. He speaks of "functional automatisms which, like cellular reactions, necessarily find their justification" in the dream process. Some dreams even enable the body to express feverish or sickly states, and herald future biological disorders. Dreams can in fact have somatic causes, a fact which, as Jung points out, has long been recognized by traditional and shamanic medicine and, more recently, by experimental psychology. Similarly, certain physical and environmental events, such as noise, heat or cold, can provoke dreams. Finally, some dreams have a traumatic, haunting content, constituting "an attempt by the unconscious to integrate the shock psychically".

=== Compensatory and psychic balance function ===
According to Jung, the main function of dreams is to contribute to psychic equilibrium, just as they contribute to biological equilibrium. Recalling the role of compensation mentioned by Alfred Adler, (Note: p. 113.) he notes that not everything we experience during the day reaches our consciousness. Some phenomena remain subliminal. In dreams, the hidden, unconscious aspect of a concept can be put into images. (Note: Essai d’exploration de l’inconscient, Robert Laffont, 1964, p. 43.) The human psyche is made up of conscious and unconscious parts, the latter of which are expressed in dreams, linking them together to safeguard psychic balance. To restore mental and even physiological stability (Jung speaks of the "compensatory biological function" of dreams), (Note: p. 115, quoting L'Homme à la découverte de son âme, p. 237.) consciousness and unconsciousness must be integrally linked, in order to evolve in parallel. (Note: Essai d’exploration de l’inconscient, Robert Laffont, 1964, p. 52.) This compensatory function is found throughout his theory. (Note: "The idea of dream compensation comes from Jung's view of 'the psyche as a self-regulating system'", p. 1473.)

In On the Interpretation of Dreams, Jung distinguishes four meanings of the dream process in terms of its psychic balancing function. Firstly, it represents the unconscious reaction to a conscious situation, and thus reacts either by restoring the daytime content or by compensating for it. Secondly, the dream reveals a situation arising from the conflict between consciousness and the unconscious. Through compensation, the dream represents the unconscious' tendency to transform the conscious attitude. (Note: For example: "those who lack realism or think too highly of themselves, or who make grandiose plans that bear no relation to their real abilities, dream that they are flying or falling", in L'Homme et ses symboles, Robert Laffont, 1964, p. 50.) Finally, the unconscious processes inherent in the dream have no relation whatsoever to the conscious situation. (Note: p. 16: Jung explains that this difference between the nature of dream processes and those of the conscious mind leads to the subject's astonishment at these productions. The primitives called these astonishing dreams great dreams, while the Latin oracles regarded them as somnia a deo missa ("dreams sent by the gods" in Latin).) Jung's conception of the unconscious sees dreams as "indispensable messengers, transmitting information from the instinctive to the rational part of the human mind". (Note: L'Homme et ses symboles, Robert Laffont, 1964, p. 52.) To represent this non-rational instinctive part, Jung takes into account the relationship between the personal unconscious and the collective foundations of the human imagination. For him, this collective unconscious produces meaning and compensates for the attitude of the ego, in order to maintain or re-establish psychic equilibrium; indeed, the "dream is a spontaneous and symbolic self-representation of the current situation of the unconscious". (Note: p. 254.) For Jung, the dream is therefore an expression of the overall psychic situation, which is as much a representation of the momentary state of consciousness as it is of the collective dimension of the unconscious, (Note: Dream" entry, p. 79.) making it an energy regulator that compensates for daytime life.

=== Prospective function ===
Dreams have a foresight function, enabling us to find a way out of an immediate conflict. (Note: Dream" entry, p. 80.) To reduce the polysemy of the term, Jung sometimes speaks of the "intuitive function" of dreams. (Note: p. 116.) This prospective function is not in fact a premonitory dream, but teaches the dreamer a path to follow. As the unconscious possesses absolute knowledge enabling it to anticipate the future, Jung sees this dream function as the key to explaining certain "psychic" (Note: "The unconscious is said to have the ability to go beyond the normal course of time, perceiving things that do not yet exist", p. 21.) faculties such as telepathy. Nevertheless, Jung only really considers dreams that forecast future transformations in the dreamer's personality, and explains that "it would be unjustified to call them prophetic, for they are, basically, as little prophetic as a medical or meteorological prognosis". (Note: p. 116, quoting L'Homme à la découverte de son âme, p. 242.) These dreams therefore take their place within individuation, a central concept for Jung. He considers the prospective function to have two meanings: it is both integrative and synthetic (or "reductive").

Within this prospective function, Jung includes a category of dreams: those in which certain psychic events penetrate the unconscious sphere. This is the case of dreams announcing the death of a loved one. Jung notes that these cases are close to a "situational instinct". In his latest work, the Swiss psychiatrist sees this category of dreams as examples of synchronicity, i.e. acausal relationships between a real event on the one hand and a psychic and emotional state on the other. Conversely, dreams can evoke past events, both known and unknown to the subject. Jung likens them to the phenomenon of cryptomnesia. More recent emotionally intense memories are found to be more incorporated into dreams than older memories–with newer memories from recent waking life having a strong link to frontal theta activity in the REM stage of sleep.

== Dream interpretation ==
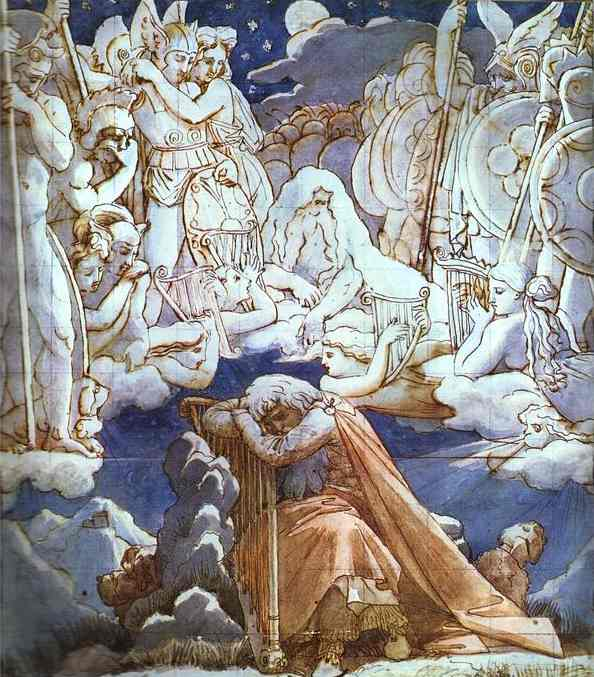
The Songs of Ossian, by Jean Auguste Dominique Ingres, 1811 or 1813.

Jung took his cue from Freud's psychoanalysis and his seminal work, The Interpretation of Dreams (Traumdeutung in German), and believed that dreams could be deciphered. (Note: According to Freud, dream interpretation "is concerned with making sense of the constituent elements of the manifest text (restoring their latent meaning), using the dreamer's associations", in the entry "Rêve", by Roger Perron, p. 1469, Volume II.) However, Freudian concepts such as latent content and manifest content do not enable him to derive a meaning in line with the subject's equilibrium. (Note: "The distinction between the manifest and latent meanings of the dream was never established by Jung", p. 1473.) Jung therefore developed various notions and practices specific to his theory, based on his particular approach to the symbol.

=== Dreams and symbols: the language of dreams ===
For Jung, the dream is the "theater of symbols", in the sense that a "symbol", as distinct from a "sign", is an image that combines contradictory contents, one conscious and the other unconscious. For Jung, "the symbol is endowed with a subjective dynamism that exerts a powerful attraction on the individual, acting as a transformer of psychic energy", explains Thomas B. Kirsch. Monstrous motifs remain significant in this respect: "the presence in dreams of monstrous or hybrid figures often points to an incursion of the non-homogenous, of independent motifs that are not part of the dream context". Moreover, symbols are natural, spontaneous products of the unconscious, obeying the principle of psychic economy. (Note: L'Homme et ses symboles, Robert Laffont, 1964, p. 55.) Thus, dream symbolism obeys the law of the smallest force necessary, bringing together in a single object several important clues, as Yves Delage already noted in his book Le Rêve (1921). (Note: p. 291.)

However, the same symbol does not necessarily have the same meaning from one dream to the next. This is why Jung has always opposed the possibility of interpreting dreams by means of manuals. (Note: "More generally, it's utterly stupid to believe that there are prefabricated, systematic guides to interpreting dreams, as if you could simply buy a book to consult and find the translation of a given symbol. No symbol appearing in a dream can be abstracted from the individual mind which dreams it, and there is no definite and direct interpretation of dreams", in L'Homme et ses symboles, Robert Laffont, 1964 p. 53.) Recurring motifs (such as falling, flying, chasing etc.) require individual interpretations, because their meaning depends on the context and life of the dreamer. (Note: Essai d’exploration de l’inconscient, Robert Laffont, 1964, p. 53.) In Jungian theory, "dream teachings" are always personal. Thus, the explanation of the dream is complete when we succeed in indicating "the dreamer's distance from the realization of the demands of the collective unconscious". (Note: p. 298.) Knowing the collective unconscious and its hold on the subject is the crucial phase of Jungian psychotherapy. In the course of treatment, there always comes a point when the patient's imaginations change character, and interpretation can no longer be based (solely) on repressed personal elements. These particular materials must then be compared from a collective angle, in order to amplify the interpretation. This "mythic shift" (Note: p. 111.) characterizes the Jungian approach.

=== Amplification ===
"Amplification is a kind of delimited, coherent and directed work of association, which always leads back to the quintessence of the dream and seeks to elucidate it by illuminating it from every possible angle," explains Jolande Jacobi, an analyst close to Jung. This approach reveals the point of divergence between Freudian analysis, on the one hand, which presents itself "as a monologue", and Jung's, in which the dream is an "object of examination", according to Charles Baudouin. Jung also warns against over-interpretation, which is sterile and dangerous even for the dreamer. (Note: p.197: "We will therefore not seek associative material except insofar as seems necessary to attribute a usable meaning to the dream".) Jung's French translator, psychiatrist Roland Cahen, also stresses the danger of unrestrained amplification. Moreover, amplification aimed at "arousing in the analyst a richer understanding of his dream" is less widely used today, as experience has shown that it avoids confronting complexes. (Note: p. 1473.)

In practice, the method of amplification (which Jung explains in the second part of On the Interpretation of Dreams, made up of seminar notes from 1938 and 1939) consists in getting the dreamer to express what immediately comes to mind from a dream scene. (Note: George W. Baylor and Daniel Deslauriers, Le Rêve, sa nature, sa fonction, et une méthode d'analyse, Les Presses de l'Université du Québec, 1991, p.90) In this way, the analyst can explore a maximum number of possible meanings that make up the patient's imaginary world, revolving around a "central core of meaning". (Note: On the method of dream interpretation", p. 13: "using this nucleus as a basis, we can discover the key to interpreting each dream in the series". See also p. 22.) For Jung, this method enables the analyst to identify the archetype(s) constellated, i.e. excited, in the subject's unconscious. Jung's approach is therefore exhaustive in terms of symbolic motifs, whereas Freud, with his method of free associations, (Note: Jung's criticism of the free association method is that it "can leave the content of the dream completely out of account and get bogged down in complexes that are not necessarily essential", in L'Homme à la découverte de son âme, pp. 277-278.) develops the same motif, moving away from an initial association by an association on this association, and so on. While the analyst helps and guides the amplification, it is imperative that the patient approves and even validates the conclusions in some way, and "Jung insists on the necessity of obtaining the patient's assent to the proposed interpretation".

The method of amplification must also be applied to each element of the dream. The "lion" motif, for example, evokes the subject's thirst for power; (Note: For an example of amplification based on Jérôme Cardan's lion motif, see pp. 12) then the analyst asks him again what the word power means to him, and so on. This is personal amplification, which Jung extends (and this is specific to his theory) through collective and cultural amplification. (Note: pp. 42-43. Jung calls this collective approach the "method of people's psychology", p. 44.) Children's dreams are part of this. The analyst must then conduct bibliographical research and possess a broad cultural background in order to identify symbolic correspondences between motifs.

=== Interpretation on three levels: subject, object and transference ===
Jung introduced schematic analysis to dream interpretation. He distinguished between the "subject level" and the "object level". As the dream compensates for the dreamer's daytime life, the analyst can interpret the dream production on the object level, enabling the subject to confront archetypes, or on the subject level, giving him/her the opportunity to reappropriate the libidinal energy contained in the projections he/she has made onto the object.

The object level is an interpretation that refers each motif and symbol to external elements. The method breaks down dream elements in order to discover their meaning according to the dreamer. The subject level concerns the dreamer's own self. Jung relates an example of interpretation to the person's own experience, as in this example: "A patient wants to cross a river when she sees herself held back by the foot by a crab. This patient is in a homosexual relationship with a friend and, by association, comes to think that the crab's claws represent her friend's monopolizing affection. This is the interpretation from the object perspective, but it does not exhaust the material in relation to the subject itself, for the crab is an animal that moves backwards - evidence of a regressive disposition - and is associated with cancer, suggesting that the root of homosexuality is terribly dangerous. (Note: Psychologie de l'inconscient, p. 62.) The aim of this approach is to dissociate the dream elements, retaining only what concerns the dreamer. In this way, a subject-oriented interpretation reduces the patient's projections by bringing unconscious images to the fore, while the assimilation of complexes is, for analytical psychology, a matter of becoming aware of them.

Nevertheless, the dream can be considered on either of these two levels, since it is constantly immersed in a milieu of primitive, "adualistic" (duality-free) thought. The phenomenon of mystical participation leads to the fusion of object and subject in the dream image. (Note: Baudouin defines this adualistic thinking as an undifferentiated state in which subject and object are not distinct, akin to primitive thinking, which Pierre Janet has studied, p. 101.) Jung adds a third level of interpretation, that of transference, which takes into account the other two levels, as well as the transferential relationship between the dreamer and the analyst, in the context of psychotherapy.

=== Dream series and dramatic structure ===
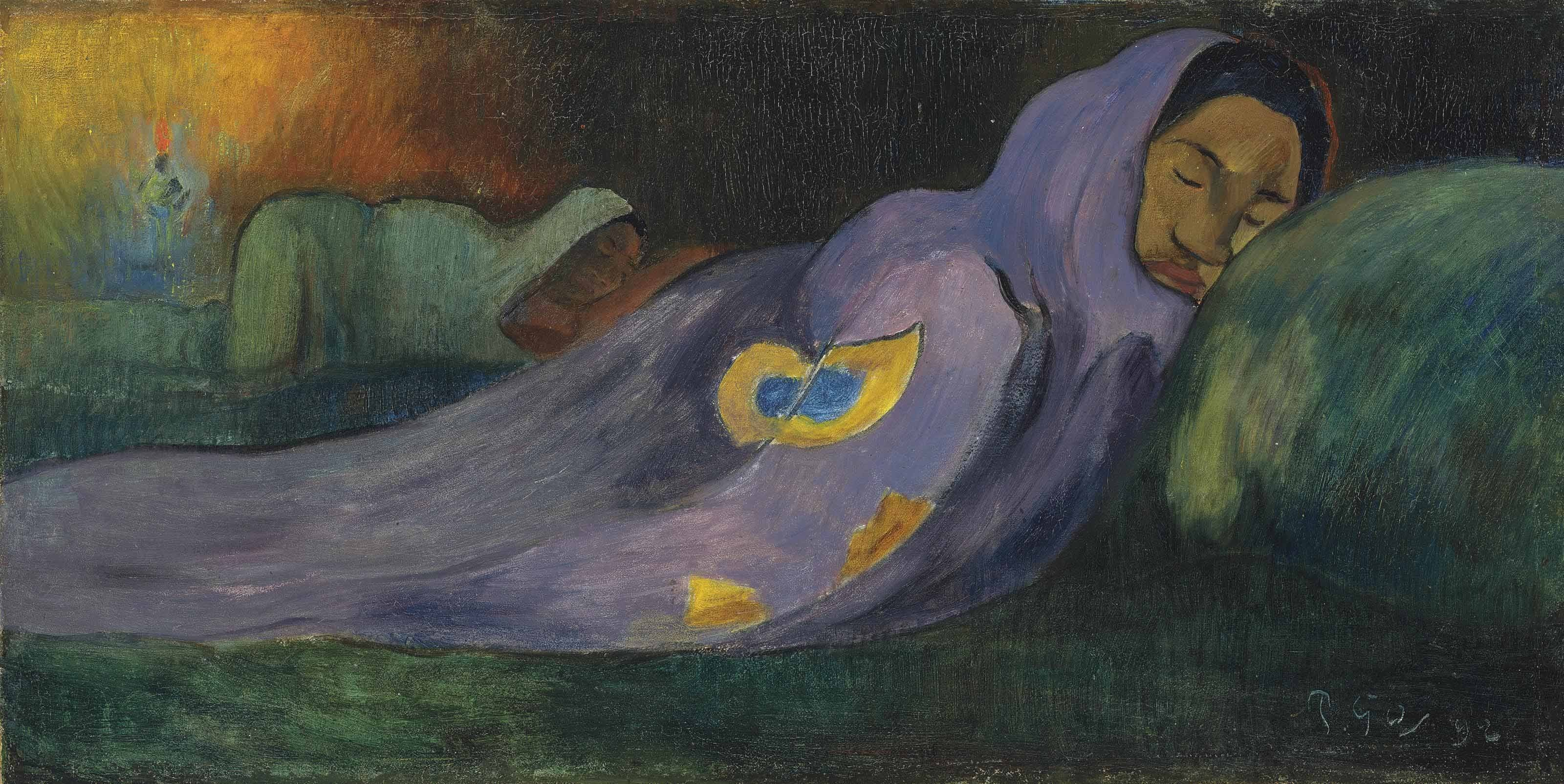
Paul Gauguin, Le Rêve, 1892.

In On the Method of Dream Interpretation, Jung writes that "the dream series can be compared to a kind of monologue that takes place unbeknownst to consciousness. This monologue, perfectly intelligible in dreams, sinks into the unconscious during periods of wakefulness, but in reality never ceases. It's likely that we are in fact constantly dreaming, even in the waking state, but that consciousness produces such a din that the dream is no longer perceptible to us. Indeed, a single dream is not enough; the unconscious always uses a series of dreams to influence the conscious, even if "the series which (...) appears chronological is not the true series". The analyst must therefore interpret continuous sets of dreams in which a dynamic of representations is revealed. Jung gives two significant examples of the value of studying dream series, through the cases of "Miss Miller" (in Métamorphoses de l'âme et ses symboles) and physicist Wolfgang Pauli (whom Jung also had as a patient) in Psychologie et alchimie. As Jung points out, these series of dreams seem to point towards an unconscious desire for centrality and totality, which he calls individuation.

Moreover, when a dream is too complex, it makes sense to schematize it. For example, Jung sees a dream as a drama, comprising an exposition of the situation (place, time and dramatis personae) and the problem, followed by the adventures and finally the lysis or result of the dream, which is also the compensatory representation of the dream action. In fact, most dreams follow a similar dramatic structure, which the ritual also reproduces at the conscious level. The specificity of analytical psychology lies in the fact that dreams are seen as dramatic personifications of complexes. (Note: L'Homme à la découverte de son âme, p. 189.)

=== Concentric method and ethical principles of interpretation ===
While the free association method proceeds by arborescence, gradually moving away from the primitive dream image, Jung's method is "concentric", tending to return to the dream image. The Freudian method is considered too defensive, as it allows for a reduction to the original figure. Jung therefore prefers a circular, circumambulatory method that is found in spiritual traditions such as alchemy and Gnosticism, and which he calls amplification. But it's not just a technical approach, it's also an ethical position for the practitioner in relation to the dream and the dreamer.

The analyst must assume that he or she knows nothing about the dream and cannot form a preconceived or theoretical opinion. Indeed, Jung explains that, given the "infinite variability of dreams", it is best to "treat the dream as a totally unknown object ". (Note: p. 118.) Marie Louise von Franz puts it this way: "We should observe dreams as objectively as possible (...). The dream brings a new message that neither the analyst nor the subject can know in advance ". The analyst also has a role to play in this interpretation. The analyst is there to guide the dreamer in the initial interpretative work of amplifying the dream. On the other hand, certain images can be harmful, and the analyst has a duty, particularly through transference, to genuinely help the patient make them conscious. For Jung, transference, in contrast to Freud, has a useful purpose in treatment: by becoming the object of the dreamer's projections, the analyst enables him or her to make certain unconscious contents conscious.

== Genesis of the concept ==
=== Philosophical and psychoanalytical heritage ===
==== Dream interpretation before Jung ====
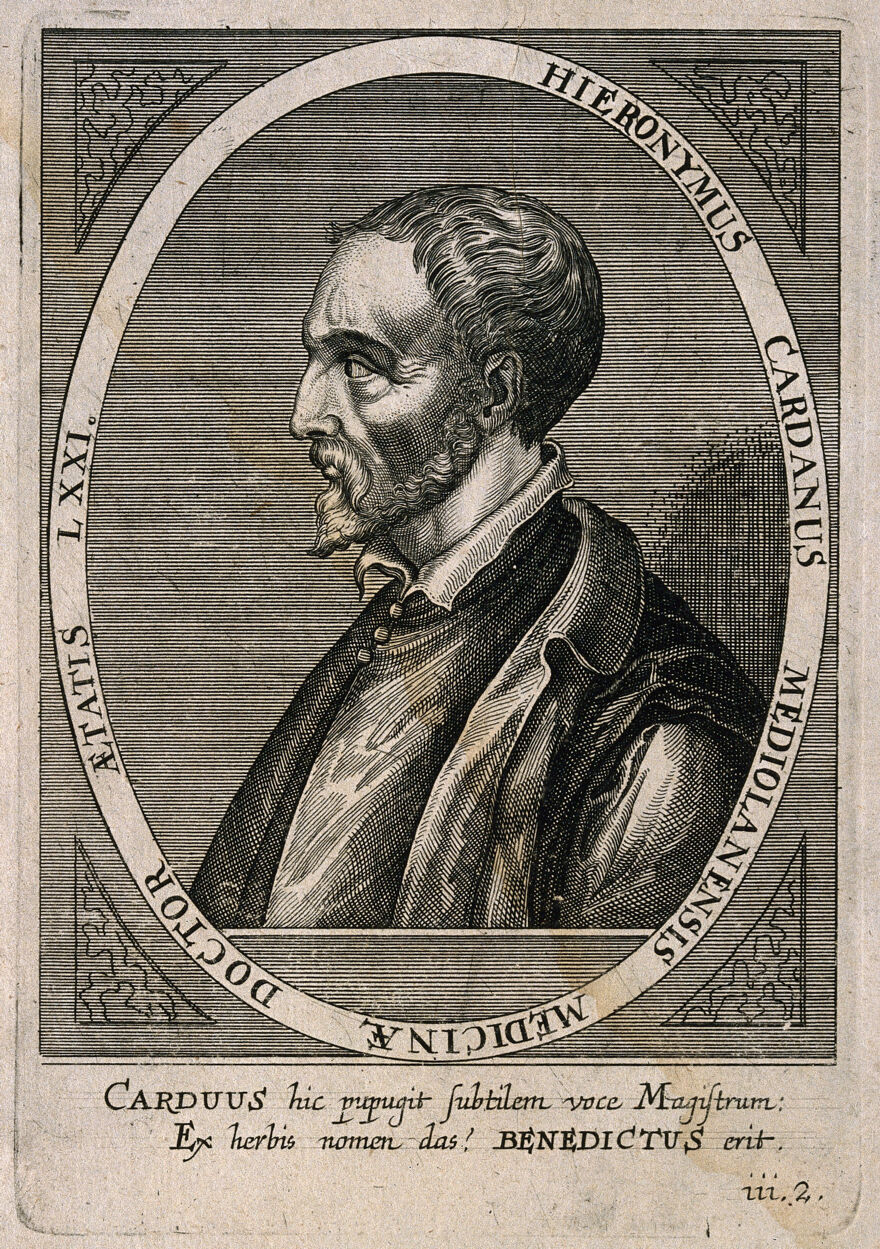
Jung uses as study material the insights of Jerome Cardan, who is said to have found the solution to the third-degree equation in his dreams.

As in the Jewish Kabbalah, for Jung, the dream carries its own meaning. Nevertheless, in his various seminars, Jung often traces his scientific interest in dreams back to early Christian theological figures. Thus, in his seminar notes of 1936 and 1937, forming the first part of his synthesis work On the Interpretation of Dreams, he draws up a historical panorama ranging from Artemidorus of Daldis (2nd c.) with his Five Books on the Art of Interpreting Dreams, to Macrobius (b. c. 370), through his Commentary on the Dream of Scipio, and Synesios of Cyrene (4th-5th c., with Traité sur les visages du rêve) and more modern figures such as Caspar Peucer (1525 - 1602), author of De somniis, Abbé Richard (18th c.) and his Théorie des songes, Franz Splittgerber (Schlaf und Tod, 1866) and, in the 20th century, Yves Delage (1854 - 1920) with Le rêve (1920). In the third part of the same work, corresponding to the seminar notes from 1940 - 1941, Jung devotes a long, practical study to the dreams of Jerome Cardan, then to the visions of Saint Perpetua (died 203), applying the method of amplification. In this way, Jung attempts to show that these thinkers, before psychoanalysis and often in curiously similar terms, were interested in dreams as sensible productions of the mind. For Françoise Parot, Jung is the heir to the mystics and Romantics, Carl Gustav Carus and Gotthilf Heinrich von Schubert in particular.

==== Freud's "science of dreams": influence and extension in Jung's work ====
Apart from this philosophical and theological heritage, it was above all Freud and his science of dreams that most influenced the young Jung, then a psychiatrist at the University Psychiatric Clinic in Zurich. Indeed, Freud's contribution is fully acknowledged by Jung: "Freud was essential for me, especially through his fundamental research into the psychology of hysteria and dreams", (Note: Ma vie. Souvenirs, rêves et pensées, p. 140.) he says in his autobiography. Nevertheless, while Freud saw dreams as a condensation of repressed unconscious processes, Jung saw them as revealing complexes, a notion he developed during his experiments with word associations, with Franz Riklin, at the University Psychiatric Clinic in Zurich. (Note: p. 188: "the via regia to the unconscious is not opened up by dreams, as [Freud] claims, but by complexes, which give rise to dreams and symptoms".) Like Freud, however, dreams - to which Jung added daydreams, fantasies and visions - remained the preferred material for analysis. Freud insisted that "any key to dreams", i.e., any list of symbolic equivalences of general value, should be excluded. He does, however, admit a few universal symbols, carried by culture, and certain "typical dreams" whose paradigms can be found in many dreamers. (Note: Dream" entry, by Roger Perron, p. 1469, Vol. II.)

Freud, however, sees dreams as a repetition of obsessive past events: for him, dreams are merely "the veiled expression of a complex, whether this complex be linked to lust, power or sexuality". Jung called this approach reductio in primam figuram, and contrasted it with his own concentric approach, which he called amplification. The first notion Jung criticized was censorship. He refused to speak of the "facade" of the dream, just as he rejected the classic Freudian distinction between latent and manifest content, because he considered that "dreams do not delude, lie, distort or disguise; on the contrary, they naively announce what they are and what they think. (...) Their inability to be any clearer corresponds to the inability of consciousness to understand, or to want to understand, the point in question". (Note: Psychologie et éducation, Buchet/Chastel, Paris, 1963, pp 71-72.) "The fundamental difference with Freud is that, for Jung, "the dream is entirely what it is"; here, the dream is its own interpretation. What's more, whereas Freud sees the dream as an aimless assemblage of images, a façade, Jung sees it as a moralizing message (concerning the dreamer's ethics and behavior) and, as such, with a purpose. (Note: pp. 201-203.) As he repeatedly emphasizes, his finalist conception is fundamentally opposed to Freud's causalist one. The dream is what it is, not an anthropomorphic construct," explains Charles Baudouin. (Note: p. 106.) His theory of dream-compensation develops Freud's theory of dream-desire. (Note: p. 114.)

=== Jung's dream research: from psychoanalysis to analytical psychology ===
It was while still a student at the Burghölzli in Zurich that Jung read Freud's Interpretation of Dreams. He then reported on it to the other students in his psychiatry course, and in particular to his supervisor, Eugen Bleuler. Jung joined the psychoanalytical movement after meeting Freud in 1907. At the time, his psychiatric practice focused mainly on the collection and study of patients' dreams. As early as 1906, Jung had praised the Freudian method in his book Psychologie de la démence précoce (Psychology of Premature Dementia), a copy of which he sent to Freud, who welcomed it. Yet Jung had already referred to Freud's interpretation of dreams in his 1902 psychiatric thesis, Psychologie et pathologie des phénomènes dits occultes. As soon as he embraced psychoanalysis, Jung began to multiply his theoretical studies on dreams. In 1908, he published the article "The Freudian Theory of Hysteria", (Note: "Freudian Theory of Hysteria" has never been translated into French. The essay is published in: Collected Works of C. G. Jung, vol. 4, Princeton University Press, 1970, 368 p, pp. 10-24, §. 27-63) followed in 1909 by a synthesis in "The Analysis of Dreams", (Note: "L'Analyse des rêves" is published in: (en) Collected Works of C. G. Jung, vol. 4, Princeton University Press, 1970, 368 p., pp. 25-34, §. 64-94, original text in Année psychologique, no XV, 1909, pp. 160-167, available online at persee.fr. Accessed November 30, 2009.) in which he used all Freud's concepts, such as censorship and latent and manifest content. The study even closes with a recommendation, not only to psychiatrists and neurologists, but also to psychologists, to use the psychoanalytic method.

It was with his study "On the Meaning of Numerical Dreams" (Note: « Sur la signification des rêves de nombres », in L’Énergétique psychique, Genève, Georg librairie de l’université, 1973, pp. 107-117.) in 1910 that Jung began to distance himself from Freudian thought, a separation that would culminate in 1912, after their official break. In the same year, he published a final plea, "On the Critique of Psychoanalysis", (Note: "Sur la critique de la psychanalyse" has never been translated into French. The essay is published in: Collected Works of C. G. Jung, vol. 4, Princeton University Press, 1970, 368 p., pp. 74-77, §. 194-196.) before gradually introducing and developing his own theory. Indeed, Jung began to develop his own ideas on the meaning of dreams shortly after his break with Freud, in 1912 and 1913. During this period, he experienced what Henri F. Ellenberger called a "creative illness", which brought him into direct contact with unconscious images, which he drew and compiled in his Red Book. Volume 5 of The Theory of Psychoanalysis, entitled "The Fantasies of the Unconscious", (Note: La Théorie de la psychanalyse was published in French under the title : La Théorie psychanalytique, Paris, Montaigne, 1932.) from 1912, sets out the postulates of the newly created analytical psychology, which he defines as a method of investigating the unconscious that does not rely on sexuality as Freud perceived it. Jung explains that the unconscious is the key to the etiology of neuroses. He also shows that there are clear parallels between the imaginary contents of the unconscious and those of mythology, parallels that dreams express in symbolic terms.

In 1916, Carl Gustav Jung published Allgemeine Gesichtspunkte zur Psychologie des Traumes (General Viewpoints on the Psychology of Dreams), in which he developed his own understanding of dreams, which differed greatly from that of Freud. From then on, dreams became material for comparative study, enabling Jung to advance other concepts and hypotheses such as the collective unconscious, in Metamorphosis and Symbols of the Libido, and archetypes. Later, when he turned to alchemy and its allegories as working material, he would nevertheless continue to illuminate their motifs by comparing them with patients' dreams. Throughout his career, Jung amassed a considerable number of dreams, enabling him to declare his method empirical. In 1928, he outlined his method in an article entitled "On Dreams", which was reprinted in Man Discovering His Soul (1948) and constitutes his most synthetic introduction to his conception of the dream process.

== Dream and unconsciousness ==
=== Archetypes and dreams ===
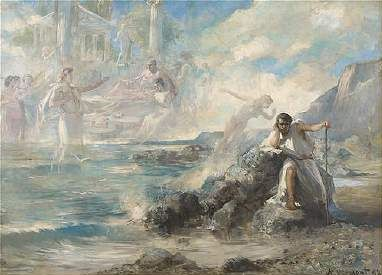
Nicolae Vermont, Ulysses' Dream, 1893.

For Jung, dreams express archetypes, the unconscious structures that shape the human imagination. Freud had also noted, in The Interpretation of Dreams, the existence of "typical dreams" made by a large number of people that do not designate personal imperatives. But "Freud paid little attention to these dream motifs", explains Claire Dorly. Jung, on the other hand, linked them to the notion of the collective unconscious, which he developed as early as 1912, and which refers to the imaginal reservoir of human representations. Marie Louise von Franz states that "fairy tales, like archetypal dreams, reflect slow, profound processes taking place within the collective unconscious". Mythological themes are rich in such images, which dreams use. These images, through the medium of the symbol, allow us to go beyond consciousness and inform the subject of an underlying problem or future evolution of the unconscious personality. If the dream's content is too shocking for the conscious mind, the latter immediately awakens in order to avoid its revelation. On the other hand, when the dream emphasizes a completely conscious problem, this also provokes awakening. (Note: p. 147.) These images "have a function of their own by virtue of their historical character [and are] the link between the rational universe of consciousness and the world of instinct ". (Note: Essai d’exploration de l’inconscient, Gallimard, 1988, pp. 57-58.) Thus, the unconscious is represented in dreams by the land of the dead, symbolizing the unknowable.

The connection between dream images and those of mythologies, cultures and religions enables Jung to speculate on the origin of consciousness. In Man Discovering His Soul, he explains that "the similarities between typical dream motifs and mythological themes make it possible to suppose (...) that dream thought is an earlier phylogenetic form of our thought ". (Note: L'âme et la vie, p. 211.) Consciousness would thus have gradually emerged from the unconscious psyche, notably through attention and volition. The warning function that dreams retain, warning the subject of immediate danger and making it a "timely reaction ", (Note: L’Homme à la découverte de son âme, p. 210.) testifies to the proximity of the dream process to the instincts. The dream is therefore a psychic process close to that undifferentiated state between the unconscious and the conscious which, in particular, enables the body's needs to be expressed. (Note: "Understanding the dream brings us back, as Jung says, to the "saurian within us", since we have a neurosis because we ignore the fundamental laws of our body, our animality in fact", p. 84.)

=== The Anima and Animus ===
The archetypes of the male anima and female animus, depicted in the guise of the opposite sex, are the relational functions of the conscious mind with the unconscious psyche in analytical psychology. (Note: p. 225.) Thus, Athena for the Greeks, Beatrice for Dante or Helen in Goethe's Faust, are cultural representations of the anima for the man, who acts as a guide for the sleeping ego, in the depths of the unconscious, while for the woman, the animus is often personified by a male assembly issuing categorical judgments and made up of figures ranging from father to brother to lover. These complexes, which Jung calls "contra-sexual", are relatively autonomous within the psyche, and thus influence the conscious, through the dream. Thus: "The anima, in man, is always part of a system of relationships. We can even speak of a system of erotic relationships, whereas the animus in women does not represent this at all: it appears as an intellectual problem, a system of understanding". (Note: p. 149.) The first step in Jungian psychotherapy is therefore to objectify the anima or animus through the study of dream series.

The use of these concepts in the study of dreams was continued by Gaston Bachelard, who re-used them in The Poetics of Reverie (1960). The phenomenological philosopher writes that "pure dreaming, filled with images, is a manifestation of the anima". Although he is mainly concerned with daydreams, Bachelard seeks to show that poetry is concerned with the revelation of archetypal patterns, which in turn derive from the world of dreams, the aim being to uncover a "phenomenology of the soul".

=== Children and big dreams ===
From 1936 to 1941, Jung was interested in children's dreams, and in particular in a class of dream productions he called "big dreams", i.e. those that come from the depths of the collective unconscious. His studies gave rise to the three-volume work Les Rêves d'enfants (Children's Dreams). Different cultures also experienced great dreams. The collective dream, in fact, pours out images that concern a group of individuals, or even an entire society. Jung takes the example of a Kenyan tribe in which it is customary to recount one's great dreams, which thus concern and belong to the entire community. These dreams seem to have nothing to do with the dreamer's conscious situation and environment. They are sometimes indicative of the onset of a neurosis or other mental illness, and are characterized by the presence of archetypes that are difficult to explain by experience or culture. Jungian analyst Michael Fordham studied these dreams in L' me enfantine et la psychanalyse, (Note: p. 450.) notably through a compilation of children's drawings.

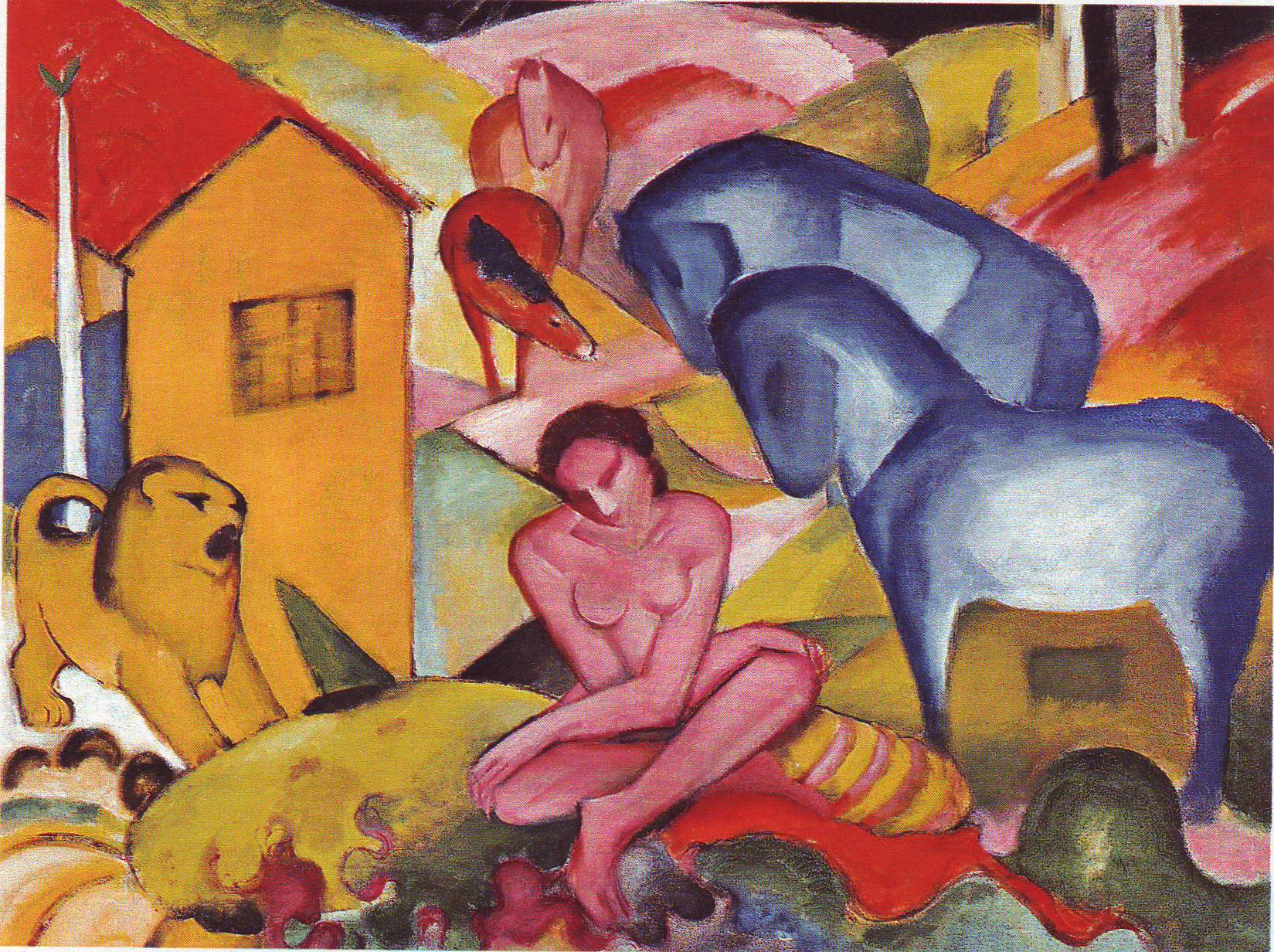
Franz Marc (1880-1916), Der Traum.

This type of dream also has a more cultural influence. Marie Louise von Franz has studied the influence of great dreams on historical figures. In Rêves d'hier et d'aujourd'hui: de Thémistocle à Descartes et à C.G. Jung (1990), Jung's successor argues that certain scientific theories and worldviews have dream origins. This same interview was published in book form in 1987, with the same title. According to her, fairy tales are also dreams about an entire community, which have become narratives over time. (Note: Marie Louise von Franz, L'Interprétation des contes de fées, Éditions Jacqueline Renard, Coll. « La Fontaine de pierre », 1990, ISBN 2-907963-08-2.)

== The study of dreams in analytical psychology after Jung ==
The study of dreams is central to analytical psychology, and many Jungian authors and analysts refer to it. Carl Alfred Meier studies the use of patients' dreams in ancient Greek sanctuaries, and in particular the dream motif of incubation. (Note: p. 424.) Mario Jacoby, with Das Tier im Traum (The Animal in Dreams, 1967), Verena Kast, Peter Schellenbaum, Barbara Hannah, Katrin Asper (with Inner Child in Dreams, 2001), Helmut Barz and Adolf Guggenbühl-Craig, among others, also use dreams as the material of choice for their investigations. Other analysts, such as James A. Hall in Jungian Dream Interpretation, have revisited the epistemological contribution of the Jungian vision of dreams. Hall with Jungian Dream Interpretation (1983), Mary Ann Matoon in Understanding Dreams (1978), Strephon Kaplan-Williams (Durch Traumarbeit zum eigenen Selbst in 1981), E. G. Whitmont and S. B. Perera's Dreams, A Portal to the Source (1989) and Harry Wilmer's How Dreams Help (1999) shed new light on analytical psychology. The study of dreams after Jung is mainly represented by three major figures: Alphonse Maeder, James Hillman and Étienne Perrot in France.

=== Alphonse Maeder and the dream's foresight function ===
A close friend of Jung since 1906, Swiss analyst Alphonse Maeder devoted himself to studying the prospective function in dreams in two works: Sur la formation des symboles dans les rêves (Zur Entstehung der Symbolik im Traum) in 1910 and La Fonction des rêves (Funktion des Traumes) in 1912. Despite his adherence to analytical psychology, he also supported a theory that diverged from those of Jung and Freud. According to Maeder, the dream is a set of self-seeking activities with a cathartic function. Maeder also showed that the sexual interpretation of a dream is not immediate, and that the dream is always richer in meaning if the analyst does not read it as a libidinal drive. (Note: L'Homme à la découverte de son âme, Payot, 1962, p. 223.) Finally, Maeder's contribution relates above all to the prospective capacity of dreams, which he believes to be unconscious, and which goes "from sketch to sketch, preparing the solution of conflicts and actual problems that the subject seeks to represent himself by means of gropingly elected symbols", (Note: Alphonse Maeder quoted by Jung, in L'Homme à la découverte de son âme, Payot, 1962, p. 213.) and which he sets out in his article "On the psycho-analytical movement", in Chapter VII entitled "The playful theory of dreams". Dreams are therefore anticipations, not to be confused with prophetic abilities.

=== Dreams and archetypal psychology: James Hillman ===
According to American analyst James Hillman, the dreaming self is not the same as the waking self. The two selves have a twin relationship and are, in Jungian parlance, "each other's shadows", as he explains in The Beauty of Psyche, The Soul and its Symbols. (Note: James Hillman, La Beauté de Psyché. L'âme et ses symboles, Le Jour éditeur, 1993 ISBN 2-89044-489-9.) In The Dream and the Underworld, Hillman explains that the ego is an image, "a completely subjective figure, a phantom, a shadow emptied of the 'I' who surrenders to sleep". The dream does not belong to the dreamer; he or she only plays a role in it, within a dream dramaturgy. The ego must therefore relearn to familiarize itself with the dream and its world, to create an intimacy with it, to speak its language, without seeking to distort it through abusive interpretations. James Hillman uses the expression "underworld", a reference to the world of Hades in Greek mythology, to designate this dream world, which is the place of the symbolic death of the self. Animals are thus soul carriers, enabling us to enter the unconscious world. Steeped in Jungian analytical practice, Hillman rejects symbolic and cultural interpretation alone, preferring to focus solely on the image itself, and the emotion it arouses in the patient. His archetypal psychology is thus both an extension of Jung's theory and a practice in its own right, concerned solely with the patient's imagination.

=== Étienne Perrot and the language of dreams ===
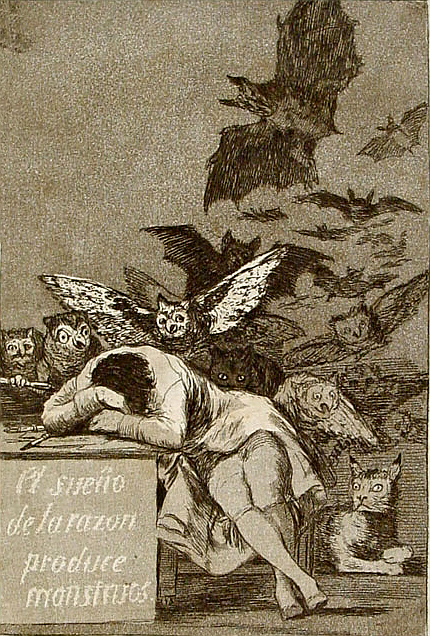
The dream according to Francisco de Goya.

Étienne Perrot (1922–1996), the principal French translator of Jung's later works and of the I Ching, developed one of the most original extensions of Jungian dream theory in the French-speaking world. Building on Jung's observation that words carry not only abstract meanings but also emotional and unconscious resonance, Perrot explored what he called the langue des oiseaux — the language of the birds — as a fundamental mode by which dreams express psychic reality in parallel with conscious language. For Perrot, this phonetic dimension of the dream is not mere wordplay: it is a direct path into the unconscious, analogous to the alchemical rule of obscurum per obscurius and related to the condensation that characterises the latent content of dreams. He recognised in the dream a motivation independent of consciousness, and even a particular humour, which surfaces through this language of birds. By deconstructing a word through the sounds it contains, the unconscious reveals another layer of meaning — one that the dreamer does not consciously produce. He justified this double reading by citing the alchemist Michael Maier, whose works he had himself translated: words exist because of the things they describe, not the reverse.

In practice, Perrot showed that the dream-word carries several strata of meaning simultaneously. A dream evoking a "parchment" (parchemin) may, through phonetic resonance, reveal par le chemin ("by the path") — evoking symbols of freedom and personal development. Etymology also remains active in dreams regardless of the dreamer's conscious knowledge: the word "laboratory" still contains in the unconscious the double Latin sense of laborare (to work) and orare (to pray), so that seeing a laboratory in a dream may call the dreamer toward spiritual work. Characters' names, anagrams, and individual letters are likewise carriers of psychic meaning: the name "Renée" contains rebirth; "Luxembourg" points to the city of light (lux), a symbol of the Self.

This approach treats the dream as a poetic text governed by phonetic and etymological laws that ordinary consciousness does not perceive, and connects directly to the Jungian method of amplification: just as amplification illuminates a dream image from every possible symbolic angle, Perrot's langue des oiseaux does the same for the dream-word, always returning to the central core of meaning. Perrot nonetheless insisted, with Jung, that no phonetic interpretation holds value in the abstract: it must always be grounded in the dreamer's personal situation. His aim was not systematic decoding but, as he put it, attentiveness to "the meaningful analogies of the language of birds".

== Critique of the Jungian concept of dreams ==
The criticisms of Jungian dreaming and analytical psychology are of two kinds: those made by other Jungian analysts, and those not specifically related to the dream process.

Two Jungian-inspired analysts are the main critics of the amplification method of interpretation. Patricia Berry and James Hillman criticize this method for losing the primary, instinctual meaning of the dream, by dint of symbolic developments. For Berry, the amplification method shifts the image from the dreamer's personal space to a collective and cultural space, and thus loses precision by distancing itself from the original image, due to haphazard analogies. Hillman criticizes the symbolist conception of dreams for abstracting images from their context and transforming them into fixed hypostases that then deliver only literal meanings.

The criticism that Jung's thinking is more akin to mysticism than to official psychology is recurrent, and concerns the concepts of dreams and the collective unconscious as well, as Françoise Parot sums up. (Note: "Jung's thought is mystical; the wisdom of the unconscious, of which dreams are the expression, is of divine essence", p. 85.) Freudian psychoanalysts initiated the debate, notably Karl Abraham, who denounced the Swiss psychiatrist's "delaying of the unconscious", which his conception of dreams accuses him of doing. The "religious tinge" of the concept of the unconscious, which then becomes a "mystical background", makes Jung a "theologian" and no longer a psychoanalyst, in his view. Abraham continues: "Jung's elucidations of the dream shock us. Here, too, Jung fails to take account of Freudian theory when he says that the technique of interpretation consists in remembering "where the fragments of the dream come from". The originality of the Jungian vision is made up of impasses, in his view; thus "the 'prospective tendency' is not an original discovery by Jung or Maeder, but simply a new name for an impasse that Freud avoided in advance".

== General criticism ==
The idea that Freudian free association provides access to the latent content of dreams has been invalidated by experimental work which has concluded that this method is arbitrary.

== See also ==
- Dreaming (journal)
- Lucid dreaming
- Oneirology
- Oneiromancy
- Oneironautics
- International Association for the Study of Dreams (IASD)

== Bibliography ==
- Carl Jung (2005). L'Analyse des rêves volume 1. Bibliothèque jungienne. Albin Michel. p. 444. ISBN 978-2-226-15883-3.
- Carl Jung (2006). L'Analyse des rêves volume 2. Bibliothèque jungienne. Albin Michel. p. 652. ISBN 978-2-226-15893-2.
- Carl Jung (2002). Les Rêves d'enfants, volume 1. Bibliothèque jungienne. Albin Michel. ISBN 978-2-226-14238-2.
- Carl Jung (2004). Les Rêves d'enfants, volume 2. Bibliothèque jungienne. Paris: Albin Michel. ISBN 978-2-226-13496-7.
- 1899 The Interpretation of Dreams by Sigmund Freud
- 1917 A Metapsychological Supplement to the Theory of Dreams by Sigmund Freud
- 1920 Supplements to the Theory of Dreams by Sigmund Freud
- 1922 Dreams and Telepathy by Sigmund Freud
- Étienne Perrot (2007). Les Rêves et la vie. La Fontaine de pierre (in French). Paris: Éditions du Dauphin. ISBN 978-2-7163-1333-9.
- Marie Louise von Franz (2008). La Voie des rêves. La Fontaine de Pierre (in French). Paris: Éditions du Dauphin. ISBN 978-2-902707-32-4.
- Marie Louise von Franz (1985). Les Rêves et la mort. L'espace intérieur. Paris: Fayard. ISBN 978-2-213-01424-1.
- Marie Louise von Franz (1990) [1928]. Rêves d'hier et d'aujourd'hui, de Thémistocle à Descartes et C.G. Jung. Paris: Jacqueline Renard. ISBN 978-2-907963-06-0.
