= Dreamwork =

Tool of psychoanalysis

Dreamwork is the exploration of the images and emotions that a dream presents and evokes. It differs from classical dream interpretation in that it does not attempt to establish a unique meaning for the dream. In this way the dream remains "alive" whereas if it has been assigned a specific meaning, it is "finished" (i.e., over and done with). Dreamworkers take the position that a dream may have a variety of meanings depending on the levels (e.g. subjective, objective) that are being explored.

A belief of dreamwork is that each person has their own dream "language". Any given place, person, object, or symbol can differ in its meaning from dreamer to dreamer and also from time to time in the dreamer's ongoing life situation. Thus someone helping a dreamer get closer to their dream through dreamwork adopts an attitude of "not knowing" as far as possible.

In dreamwork it is usual to wait until all the questions have been asked—and the answers carefully listened to—before the dreamworker (or dreamworkers if it is done in a group setting) offers any suggestions about what the dream might mean. In fact, a dreamworker often prefaces any interpretation by saying, "if this were my dream, it might mean..." (a technique first developed by Montague Ullman, Stanley Krippner, and Jeremy Taylor and now widely practiced). In this way, dreamers are not obliged to agree with what is said and may use their own judgment in deciding which comments appear valid or provide insight. If the dreamwork is done in a group, there may well be several things that are said by participants that seem valid to the dreamer but it can also happen that nothing does. Appreciation of the validity or insightfulness of a comment from a dreamwork session can come later, sometimes days after the end of the session.

Dreamwork or dream-work can also refer to Sigmund Freud's idea that a person's forbidden and repressed desires are distorted in dreams, so they appear in disguised forms. Freud used the term 'dreamwork' or 'dream-work' (Traumarbeit) to refer to "operations that transform the latent dream-thought into the manifest dream".

== Psychodynamic perspective ==
Sigmund Freud's theory of psychoanalysis is largely based on the importance of the unconscious mind. According to the theory, the unconscious does not only affect a person during the day, but also in dreams. In the psychodynamic perspective, the transferring of unconscious thoughts into consciousness is called dreamwork (German: Traumarbeit). In dreams, there are two different types of content, the manifest and latent content. The latent content is the underlying, unconscious feelings and thoughts. The manifest content is made up of a combination of the latent thoughts and it is what is actually being seen in the dream. According to Carl Jung's principle of compensation, the reason that there is latent content in dreams is that the unconscious is making up for the limitations of the conscious mind. Since the conscious mind cannot be aware of all things at once, the latent content allows for these hidden away thoughts to be unlocked. Psychoanalysts use the knowledge of the process of dreamwork to analyze dreams. In other words, the clinician will study the manifest content to understand what the latent content is trying to say.

== Process ==
According to psychoanalytic view to be able to understand dreamwork fully, a person needs to understand how the mind transfers the latent thoughts to manifest. The first step is called condensation, and it is the combining of different unconscious thought into one. The combining of the unconscious thoughts makes it easier for the mind to express them in the dream. The step of condensation has two sub-steps, day residues and censorship. (On the other hand, according to Ullman and Erich Fromm dreams have no censorship at all). Day residues are left over daily issues that bring up some unconscious thought. The mind then displays this thought through a similar situation from the day. Before the unconscious thoughts can be displayed they are censored. Since many unconscious thoughts do not follow the moral code of society, the mind changes them to be more respectful. This is done so that it does not cause the dreamer anxiety and therefore wake them up. It is also due to censorship that multiple unconscious thoughts are combined, since it is hard to just have one slip through.

After condensation, another step in the formation of dreams is displacement. This is where the dream may direct feelings or desires onto an unrelated subject. This is similar to the practice of transference, which is a common technique used in psychoanalysis. Another step in the formation of dreams is symbolism. Objects or situations in a dream may represent something else, commonly an unconscious thought or desire. The fourth and final step in formation is secondary revision. In this step, all the thoughts are put together and are made coherent. Another point of this step is to make the dream relate to the dreamer. These four steps put together make up dreamwork.

== Dreamworkers ==
People who study the formation of dreams and then analyze them are called dreamworkers. As mentioned before, dreamworkers must work backwards from the conscious to the unconscious. Since they are not the ones who had the dream, they use a variety of methods with their clients, such as free association, to gain more insight into the context of the dream. Free association is where the client describes the dream and relates as many aspects of it to their life as possible. The dreamworker listens intently and once they have gained as much information as possible about the dream both through the dreamer's description of the dream and through the dreamer's emotional status, they may be able to understand the dream better and to gain information about the dreamer that they may not be aware of or be willing to share.

== See also ==
- Oneirology
- Oneiromancy
- Oneironautics
- Lucid dreaming
- Dreams in analytical psychology
- Dreaming (journal)
- International Association for the Study of Dreams (IASD)
