= Jeremy Taylor (dream worker) =

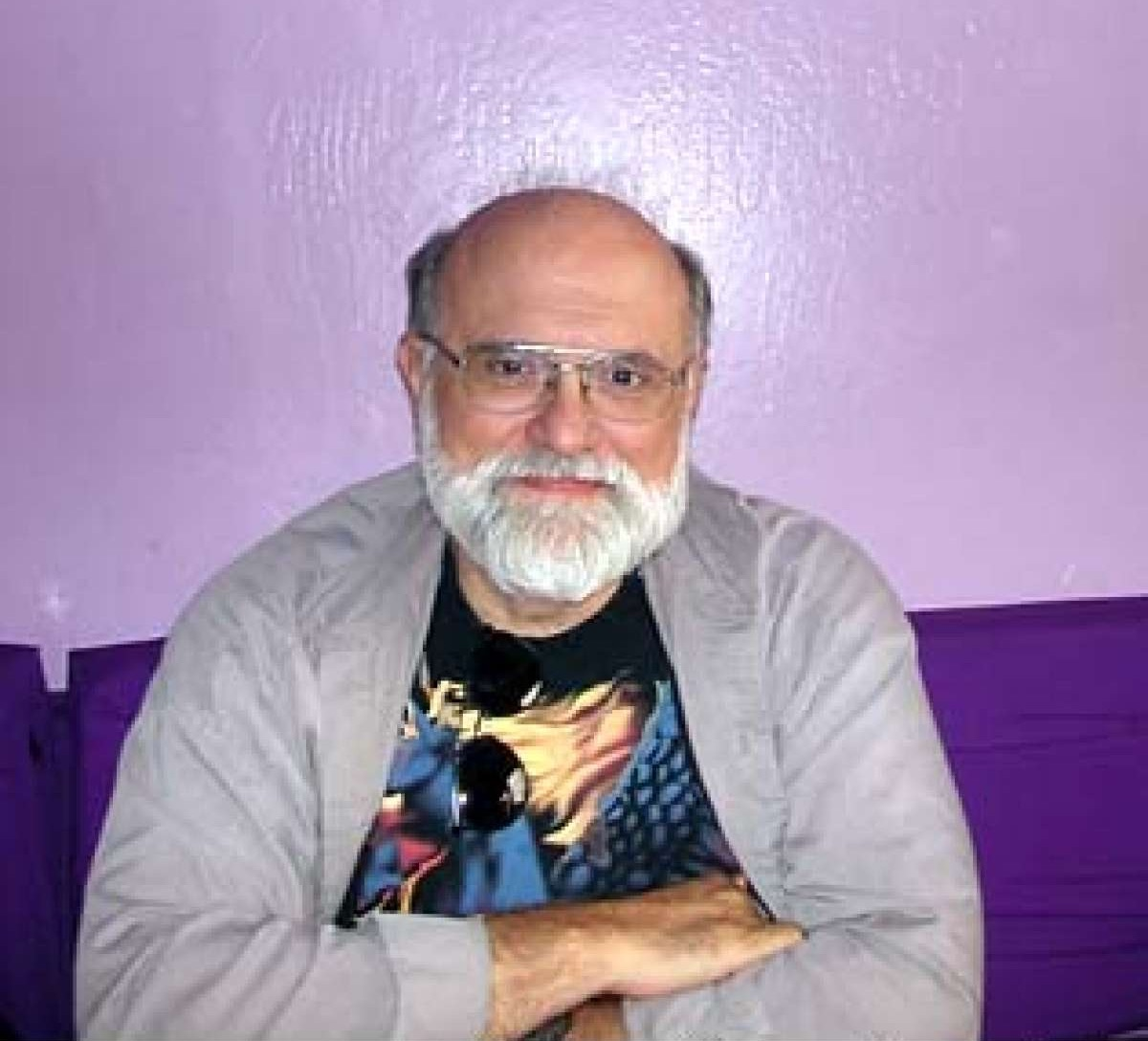
- Born: January 27, 1943
- Died: January 3, 2018 (aged 74)
- Occupations: Dream worker, author, Unitarian Universalist minister

Jeremy Taylor (1943 – January 3, 2018) was an American dream worker, author and Unitarian Universalist minister. He was a co-founder and past president of the International Association for the Study of Dreams.

He was known as a proponent of Projective Dreamwork, according to which participants in a dream group should not attempt to directly interpret the dreams of another participant. Rather they should preface their thoughts about a dream with a phrase such as 'If it were my dream...', and discuss the dream as if it were their own, in doing so acknowledging the fact that the interpreter always projects their own associations and life experience onto the dreamer.

He is often associated with his theory that dreams come 'in the service of health and wholeness', rather than merely to reflect the dreamer's life and ambitions, or scare or mock the dreamer.

== Publications ==
=== Books ===
- Dream Work (Paulist Press, 1983, ISBN 9780809125258)
- Where People Fly And Water Runs Uphill (Warner Books, 1992, ISBN 9780446394628)
- The Living Labyrinth (Paulist Press, 1998, ISBN 9780809137664)
- The Wisdom of Your Dreams: Using Dreams to Tap Into Your Unconscious and Transform Your Life (Penguin/Tarcher, 2009, ISBN 9781585427543)
