= List of The Melancholy of Haruhi-chan Suzumiya episodes =

The episodes of the original net animation (ONA) The Melancholy of Haruhi-chan Suzumiya were produced by Kyoto Animation and released on YouTube between February and May 2009. The episodes are based on a parody manga series of the same name based on the Haruhi Suzumiya series. The series does not fit into the normal continuity of the main series. During the first four episodes, the characters in the series were rendered using computer-generated imagery. Soon afterward, the character animation returned to the standard two-dimensional animation style. Twenty-five episodes were created for the ONA series, with two episodes per week (episodes 1 and 2 were released on separate weeks), alongside an episode of another ONA, Nyoro~n Churuya-san, until the last, where an extra long episode was shown. The two series were released in Japan on DVD on May 29, 2009, with a Blu-ray released on August 17, 2010. The series was released in North America by Bandai Entertainment in 2011, and was relicensed by Funimation in 2014.

There are two pieces of theme music used for the show. The opening theme song is "Ima Made no Arasuji" (いままでのあらすじ; "A Summary of the Story Up to Now") while the ending theme is "Atogaki no Yō na Mono" (あとがきのようなもの; "Something Like an Afterword"), both performed by Aya Hirano, Minori Chihara, Yuko Goto, Tomokazu Sugita and Daisuke Ono. A single of the two songs was released on April 20, 2009.

== Episodes ==
No.	Title	Original release date
1	"The Melancholy of Haruhi-chan Suzumiya Part 1"; Transliteration: "Suzumiya Haruhi-chan no Yūutsu" (Japanese: 涼宮ハルヒちゃんの憂鬱)	February 14, 2009
Kyon returns home from a tiring day, only to have his little sister reprimand him for leaving her alone. Once Kyon falls asleep, the SOS brigade appear in his New Year's Dream, with Koizumi, Yuki and Tsuruya appearing as Mt. Fuji, an Eggplant and a Crane, respectively.
2	"The Melancholy of Haruhi-chan Suzumiya Part 2"; Transliteration: "Suzumiya Haruhi-chan no Yūutsu II" (Japanese: 涼宮ハルヒちゃんの憂鬱 II)	February 21, 2009
Kyon first arrives at the clubroom, only to be deafened by Haruhi who is throwing a tantrum because she is bored. Shortly thereafter, Kyon finds Yuki playing an eroge on her laptop with the volume turned up. Kyon provides her with a set of rabbit-shaped headphones to keep the 'questionable sounds' from being heard in the room. Shortly afterwards, Kyon is accosted by Ryōko Asakura who attempts to kill him, but is stopped by Yuki. Before she fully dies, she informs Kyon that there are others who will attempt to kill him only for Kyon to reveal Yasu is the culprit.
3	"The Melancholy of Haruhi-chan Suzumiya Part 3"; Transliteration: "Suzumiya Haruhi-chan no Yūutsu III" (Japanese: 涼宮ハルヒちゃんの憂鬱 III)	February 28, 2009
Mikuru finds the clubroom deserted, with a TV set on the table. Mikuru turns it on, to find she is the audience of a local quiz show, in which Haruhi is the host, and Kyon and Yuki are the contestants. However, Haruhi's attempts of making the quiz more local go a bit too far.
4	"The Melancholy of Haruhi-chan Suzumiya Part 4"; Transliteration: "Suzumiya Haruhi-chan no Yūutsu IV" (Japanese: 涼宮ハルヒちゃんの憂鬱 IV)	February 28, 2009
Mikuru is shocked to find Yuki playing eroge on her laptop, but she is too embarrassed to tell Kyon about her discovery. Over the course of several days, Kyon notices that the books in the clubroom shelves are gradually being replaced with video games. Meanwhile, Haruhi sees Yuki wearing a different cosplay outfit every day. Later on, Yuki discovers that Ryōko has revived herself, but in a chibi form no larger than a basketball (called Ryōko "Achakura".) After rescuing the miniature Ryōko from a hungry cat, Yuki allows her to stay at her apartment.
5	"The Melancholy of Haruhi-chan Suzumiya Part 5"; Transliteration: "Suzumiya Haruhi-chan no Yūutsu V" (Japanese: 涼宮ハルヒちゃんの憂鬱 V)	March 6, 2009
The computer club challenge Haruhi to a dodgeball game in the hopes of retrieving their laptops, but Haruhi decides to play a real game of dodgeball. Her reality-altering powers allow all the players to use 100% of their abilities.
6	"The Melancholy of Haruhi-chan Suzumiya Part 6"; Transliteration: "Suzumiya Haruhi-chan no Yūutsu VI" (Japanese: 涼宮ハルヒちゃんの憂鬱 VI)	March 6, 2009
Mikuru informs Kyon of extra outfits found on the clothes rack in the corner. When informed that they belong to Yuki, a small-scale cosplay 'war' breaks out. At the end of the day, Yuki finishes an anime series she has been following, and lends her collection to Kyon. Mikuru grows upset when she sees the lead character of the series is a maid, scaring her into thinking Kyon has a 'maid fetish'. Ryoko is annoyed at how Yuki keeps putting her in baby things, although cannot help but fall victim to her idea of fun.
7	"The Melancholy of Haruhi-chan Suzumiya Part 7"; Transliteration: "Suzumiya Haruhi-chan no Yūutsu VII" (Japanese: 涼宮ハルヒちゃんの憂鬱 VII)	March 13, 2009
Haruhi holds a sport contest. When asked to bring 'a barrier to the heart' as part of a scavenger hunt, Kyon brings Koizumi over and tells him 'I love you', causing Haruhi to faint. Taniguchi lags behind in the events while Kyon gets used as a makeshift tug-of-war rope.
8	"The Melancholy of Haruhi-chan Suzumiya Part 8"; Transliteration: "Suzumiya Haruhi-chan no Yūutsu VIII" (Japanese: 涼宮ハルヒちゃんの憂鬱 VIII)	March 13, 2009
Haruhi holds a 'Close Encounters of the Third Kind' Spring Festival, in which she dresses Taniguchi as a demon and gives him food while everyone goes outside and celebrates. Yuki traps Ryoko and forces her to dress up in an outfit for Hinamatsuri.
9	"The Melancholy of Haruhi-chan Suzumiya Part 9"; Transliteration: "Suzumiya Haruhi-chan no Yūutsu IX" (Japanese: 涼宮ハルヒちゃんの憂鬱 IX)	March 20, 2009
Haruhi asks for ideas for a screenplay and ends up writing about otaku maid warriors with a month to live fighting to the death, which somehow leads to Kyon exploding.
10	"The Melancholy of Haruhi-chan Suzumiya Part 10"; Transliteration: "Suzumiya Haruhi-chan no Yūutsu X" (Japanese: 涼宮ハルヒちゃんの憂鬱 X)	March 20, 2009
After a minor scuffle with Ryōko while half asleep, Yuki heads out for a Sunday morning outing with the SOS Brigade. Ryōko cleans up the apartment to take her mind off things, but soon grows upset being stuck inside. Using an umbrella, she manages to make her way to the building entrance, only to return quickly to the safety of the apartment when a cat hungrily eyes her.
11	"The Melancholy of Haruhi-chan Suzumiya Part 11"; Transliteration: "Suzumiya Haruhi-chan no Yūutsu XI" (Japanese: 涼宮ハルヒちゃんの憂鬱 XI)	March 27, 2009
Yuki hides Ryōko in a box just before Haruhi, Mikuru, and Tsuruya arrive at her apartment to make Valentine chocolates. Haruhi's plan to create a life-size chocolate version of Mikuru is deemed impossible, so the girls pass the time fashioning chocolate sculptures, with the leftover chocolate used to make truffles (which are immediately gobbled up by Yuki). After her visitors leave at the end of the day, Yuki lets Ryōko out of the box, and shares a small chocolate cake with her.
12	"The Melancholy of Haruhi-chan Suzumiya Part 12"; Transliteration: "Suzumiya Haruhi-chan no Yūutsu XII" (Japanese: 涼宮ハルヒちゃんの憂鬱 XII)	March 27, 2009
Valentine's Day is upon the SOS Brigade, and the girls have chocolates for Kyon and Itsuki. However, they have to 'earn' their presents. The two guys leave and return, dressed as hosts in flashy suits and 'handsome' poses, which does nothing but make Mikuru cry.
13	"The Melancholy of Haruhi-chan Suzumiya Part 13"; Transliteration: "Suzumiya Haruhi-chan no Yūutsu XIII" (Japanese: 涼宮ハルヒちゃんの憂鬱 XIII)	April 3, 2009
Haruhi decides to celebrate Halloween, but knows nothing about the event, using a single image as reference. The group later makes up a Halloween monster using a jack-o'-lantern, a cape, some candles, and several bats placed on an anatomical figure. Sometime later, Yuki takes Ryoko to the supermarket and helps her out in cooking dinner. Ryoko later scolds Yuki for playing games late at night.
14	"The Melancholy of Haruhi-chan Suzumiya Part 14"; Transliteration: "Suzumiya Haruhi-chan no Yūutsu XIV" (Japanese: 涼宮ハルヒちゃんの憂鬱 XIV)	April 3, 2009
Haruhi and Kyon have a small battle involving balloons and blow-guns. However, when Mikuru wanders into the room, she is used as the unwitting victim of a balloon-decorating contest, with Itsuki as the judge. Meanwhile, Yuki finds some extra un-inflated balloons, and decides to take them home.
15	"The Melancholy of Haruhi-chan Suzumiya Part 15"; Transliteration: "Suzumiya Haruhi-chan no Yūutsu XV" (Japanese: 涼宮ハルヒちゃんの憂鬱 XV)	April 10, 2009
Using the balloons she got from Kyon, Yuki makes Ryoko a living balloon dog, although its creation is a little horrifying. While having fun with it, Ryoko walks into another trap laid by Yuki, with assistance from the dog, who suddenly talks and calls himself Kimidori.
16	"The Melancholy of Haruhi-chan Suzumiya Part 16"; Transliteration: "Suzumiya Haruhi-chan no Yūutsu XVI" (Japanese: 涼宮ハルヒちゃんの憂鬱 XVI)	April 10, 2009
Haruhi hosts a 'simple and healthy' cooking show, which to her means boiling instant noodles for ridiculous amounts of time. During the commercial, Kyon tries to practice with a katana Yuki had with her, but it ends up being too much for him.
17	"The Melancholy of Haruhi-chan Suzumiya Part 17"; Transliteration: "Suzumiya Haruhi-chan no Yūutsu XVII" (Japanese: 涼宮ハルヒちゃんの憂鬱 XVII)	April 17, 2009
Haruhi makes arrangements for a cherry blossom viewing party, which basically boils down to everyone having fun while Kyon digs a big hole.
18	"The Melancholy of Haruhi-chan Suzumiya Part 18"; Transliteration: "Suzumiya Haruhi-chan no Yūutsu XVIII" (Japanese: 涼宮ハルヒちゃんの憂鬱 XVIII)	April 17, 2009
Kyon is joined by Mikuru, Tsuruya and Yuki, who find a stone that Yuki breaks, releasing a spirit. While trying to figure out how to dig his hole, Kyon is interrupted by Arakawa who "randomly" stops by, and Mori who creates a giant crater. Unable to explain the situation to Haruhi, Kyon takes all the credit.
19	"The Melancholy of Haruhi-chan Suzumiya Part 19"; Transliteration: "Suzumiya Haruhi-chan no Yūutsu XIX" (Japanese: 涼宮ハルヒちゃんの憂鬱 XIX)	April 24, 2009
Curious about the motives of Santa, Haruhi sets Kyon to keep watch for him while everyone else has a Christmas Party. They encounter Taniguchi, who dressed up as Santa to return an unwanted kappa he stole from the computer club. When Haruhi sees him, her powers transform him into what she envisioned Santa to look like and chases him until he is apprehended by Yuki and Tsuruya. He escapes, but returns to normal.
20	"The Melancholy of Haruhi-chan Suzumiya Part 20"; Transliteration: "Suzumiya Haruhi-chan no Yūutsu XX" (Japanese: 涼宮ハルヒちゃんの憂鬱 XX)	April 24, 2009
Ryoko and Kimidori try to pull a prank on Yuki, but she is totally oblivious. While trying to get Kimidori out from under a fridge following one of their attempts, he bursts, devastating Ryoko. It turns out, she had been punk'd by both Yuki and Kimidori.
21	"The Melancholy of Haruhi-chan Suzumiya Part 21"; Transliteration: "Suzumiya Haruhi-chan no Yūutsu XXI" (Japanese: 涼宮ハルヒちゃんの憂鬱 XXI)	May 1, 2009
Haruhi, Mikuru, Yuki and Tsuruya attend a mall exhibition while Kyon and Koizumi attempt a jigsaw puzzle. Tsuruya fights against one of the show's monsters, who is really Mori, but is inevitably defeated. In the wake of the clash, Kyon and Koizumi's puzzle is ruined, leaving them frozen in place.
22	"The Melancholy of Haruhi-chan Suzumiya Part 22"; Transliteration: "Suzumiya Haruhi-chan no Yūutsu XXII" (Japanese: 涼宮ハルヒちゃんの憂鬱 XXII)	May 1, 2009
Ryoko scolds Yuki and Kimidori for being so carefree and gets them to help with the cleaning. After it is done, Ryoko becomes curious as to why Kimidori is in a kite, and joins in their fun.
23	"The Melancholy of Haruhi-chan Suzumiya Part 23"; Transliteration: "Suzumiya Haruhi-chan no Yūutsu XXIII" (Japanese: 涼宮ハルヒちゃんの憂鬱 XXIII)	May 8, 2009
Haruhi hosts a talk-show, with Kyon as her guest, but neither can think of anything worthwhile to talk about and keep getting distracted by Mikuru.
24	"The Melancholy of Haruhi-chan Suzumiya Part 24"; Transliteration: "Suzumiya Haruhi-chan no Yūutsu XXIV" (Japanese: 涼宮ハルヒちゃんの憂鬱 XXIV)	May 8, 2009
Feeling a little bored on their own, Ryoko and Kimidori discover a present from Yuki to relieve their boredom, which turns out to be a bomb. In order to save Ryoko, Kimidori carries the bomb outside before it explodes. Yuki returns and everyone is alright, although Kimidori is slightly brown.
25	"The Melancholy of Haruhi-chan Suzumiya Part 25"; Transliteration: "Suzumiya Haruhi-chan no Yūutsu XXV" (Japanese: 涼宮ハルヒちゃんの憂鬱 XXV)	May 15, 2009
Haruhi and Kyon try to decide on a new look for Mikuru, although their figure drawing skills are incredibly bad. Tsuruya helps out, but seemingly, her drawing skills were also incredibly bad due to the influence of Haruhi's powers. Afterwards, Yuki shows Kyon that she has made a dating sim of the SOS brigade, which is surprisingly full of bad ends.
