= Dreamwork (disambiguation) =

Dreamwork refers to a method of dream interpretation in that the aim is to explore the various images and emotions that a dream presents and evokes, while not attempting to come up with a single unique dream meaning.

Dreamwork may also refer to:

- Dream-Work, Sigmund Freud's theory of dream interpretation.
- DreamWorks, DreamWorks Studios
- DreamWorks Animation, an American animation studio based in Glendale, California.
- DreamWorks Records, an American record label.
- Danger Close Games, a video game developer founded in 1995 as DreamWorks Interactive LLC, a subsidiary of DreamWorks SKG.
