= Oneiromancy =

Form of divination based upon dreams

Oneiromancy (from Greek όνειροϛ (oneiros) 'dream' and μαντεία (manteia) 'prophecy') is a form of divination based upon dreams, and also uses dreams to predict the future. Oneirogen plants may also be used to produce or enhance dream-like states of consciousness. Occasionally, the dreamer feels as if they are transported to another time or place, and this is offered as evidence they are in fact providing divine information upon their return.

== Oneirocritic literature ==
Oneirocritic literature is the traditional (ancient and medieval) literary format of dream interpretation.

=== Ancient oneirocritic literature ===
==== Mesopotamia ====
The ancient Sumerians in Mesopotamia have left evidence of dream interpretation dating back to at least 3100 BC. Throughout Mesopotamian history, dreams were always held to be extremely important for divination and Mesopotamian kings paid close attention to them. Gudea, the king of the Sumerian city-state of Lagash (reigned c. 2144–2124 BC), rebuilt the temple of Ningirsu as the result of a dream in which he was told to do so. The standard Akkadian Epic of Gilgamesh contains numerous accounts of the prophetic power of dreams. First, Gilgamesh himself has two dreams foretelling the arrival of Enkidu. Later, Enkidu dreams about the heroes' encounter with the giant Humbaba. Dreams were also sometimes seen as a means of seeing into other worlds and it was thought that the soul, or some part of it, moved out of the body of the sleeping person and actually visited the places and persons the dreamer saw in his or her sleep. In Tablet VII of the epic, Enkidu recounts to Gilgamesh a dream in which he saw the gods Anu, Enlil, and Shamash condemn him to death. He also has a dream in which he visits the Underworld.

The Assyrian king Ashurnasirpal II (reigned 883–859 BC) built a temple to Mamu, possibly the god of dreams, at Imgur-Enlil, near Kalhu. The later Assyrian king Ashurbanipal (reigned 668–c. 627 BC) had a dream during a desperate military situation in which his divine patroness, the goddess Ishtar, appeared to him and promised that she would lead him to victory. The Babylonians and Assyrians divided dreams into "good", which were sent by the gods, and "bad", sent by demons. A surviving collection of dream omens entitled Iškar Zaqīqu records various dream scenarios as well as prognostications of what will happen to the person who experiences each dream, apparently based on previous cases. Some list different possible outcomes, based on occasions in which people experienced similar dreams with different results. Dream scenarios mentioned include a variety of daily work events, journeys to different locations, family matters, sex acts, and encounters with human individuals, animals, and deities.

==== Egyptian ====
In ancient Egypt, as far back as 2000 BC, the Egyptians wrote down their dreams on papyrus. People with vivid and significant dreams were thought to be blessed and were considered special. Ancient Egyptians believed that dreams were like oracles, bringing messages from the gods. They thought that the best way to receive divine revelation was through dreaming and thus they would induce (or "incubate") dreams. Egyptians would go to sanctuaries and sleep on special "dream beds" in hope of receiving advice, comfort, or healing from the gods.

The oldest oneirocritic manuscript hitherto discovered is the "Ramesside dream-book" now in the British Museum. A unique exemplar of a book of dream-interpretation from pre-Hellenistic Egypt, the surviving fragments were translated into English by Kasia Szpakowska.

Between the paws of the Sphinx, there is a stele describing how Thutmose IV restored the Sphinx as a result of a dream, on the promise of becoming a pharaoh.

==== Greek ====
Dream divination was a common feature of Greek and Roman religion and literature of all genres. Aristotle and Plato discuss dreams in various works. The only surviving Greco-Roman dreambook, the Oneirocritica, was written by Artemidorus. Artemidorus cites a large number of previous authors, all of whom are now lost. These include Astrampsychos, Nikephoros, Germanos, and Manuel Palaiologos. Seers who specialized at the interpretation of dreams were called enypniomantis (ἐνυπνιόμαντις) and brizomantis (βριζόμαντις).

- In Book XIX of the Odyssey, Penelopē said that "dreams ... which issue forth from the gate of polished horn bring true issues to pass, when any mortal sees them." (Here, there may be a pun of /KRainō/ 'I fulfill' with /KeRas/ 'horn'.)
- Likewise, Herodotos distinguished /oneiros/ (or /enar/) as "the prophetic, God-sent dream" from /en-upnion/ "the non-predictive dream".
- In the scheme of Artemidoros, the "oneiros was subdivided into two great categories: ... allēgorikos, which corresponds to the Platonic theory of the predictive dream operating in the impure soul, and the ... theōrēmatikos, which is the dream represented in the pure state of the soul."

==== Biblical ====
Dreams occur throughout the Bible as omens or messages from God;

- God speaks to Abram while he is in a deep sleep (Genesis 15);
- God speaks to Abimelech, the king of Gerar, in a dream concerning his intentions regarding Sarah, Abraham's wife (Genesis 20);
- Jacob dreams of a ladder to heaven (Genesis 28);
- his son Joseph dreamed of his future success (Genesis 37), interpreted the dreams of Pharaoh of Egypt's cupbearer and baker while imprisoned (Genesis 40) and interpreted the dreams of the Pharaoh of Egypt (Genesis 41);
- The Midianite's dream about the barley bread and his friend's interpretation of it being Gideon's army. Gideon overhears this and later defeats the Midianite army (Judges 7);
- Solomon conversed with God in his dreams (1 Kings 3);
- Daniel interpreted dreams (in the Book of Daniel 2 and 4);
- Joseph, when betrothed to Mary, was told in a dream not to fear taking Mary as his wife (Matthew 1);
- the Magi are told in a dream to avoid Herod on their journey home (Matthew 2);
- Joseph, now husband of Mary, was directed in a dream to flee with Mary and Jesus to Egypt (Matthew 2);
- Pilate's wife suffered in a dream because of Jesus (Matthew 27);
- Paul was told in a vision to go to Macedonia (Acts 16)

In Acts 2:17, Peter the Apostle quotes Joel 2:28, saying that because of the Spirit now out poured, "...your old men will dream dreams."

=== Medieval oneirocritic literature ===
==== Āstika ====
The pertinent material is included in the several Purāṇa-s, such as the Liṅga Purāṇa.

==== Arabic ====
Here, dreams about specific numbers or about reading specific chapters of the Qurʼan are among the chief subjects of prognostication. The most renowned of the Arabic texts of oneiromancy is the Great Book of Interpretation of Dreams, a 15th-century compilation of earlier scholarship.

==== European ====
Achmet is an adaptation of an Arabic book to the tastes of a European readership.

Derived from older literature, modern dream-books are still in common use in Europe and the United States, being commonly sold along with good-luck charms.

==== Japanese ====
Sei Shonagon refers to having her dreams interpreted in The Pillow Book.

The Taiheiki, a 14th-century war chronicle, portrays Emperor Godaigo selecting Kusunoki Masashige as the leader of his forces based on a portentous dream.

== Other oneiromantic traditions ==
The indigenous Chontal of the Mexican state of Oaxaca use Calea zacatechichi, a flowering plant, for oneiromancy by placing it under the pillow of the dreamer. Similarly, Entada rheedei is used in various African cultures.

== See also ==
- Carl Jung
- Dreaming (journal)
- Dreams in analytical psychology
- Dreamwork
- Hatsuyume
- International Association for the Study of Dreams (IASD)
- Lucid dreaming
- Oneirology
- Oneironautics
- Precognition
- Sigmund Freud
- Synchronicity
- The Dreaming
- Unconscious mind
