= Oneirology =

Scientific study of dreams

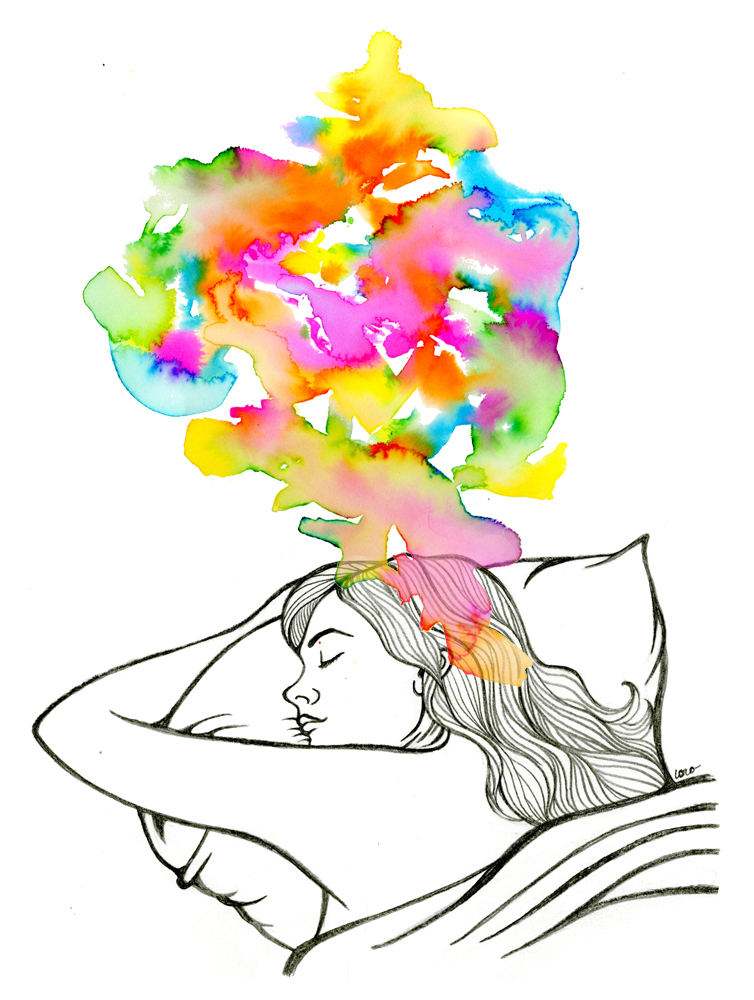
An artist's depiction of a dream

In the field of psychology, the subfield of oneirology (/ɒnaɪˈrɒlədʒi/; from Ancient Greek ὄνειρον (oneiron) 'dream' and -λογία (-logia) 'the study of') is the scientific study of dreams. Research seeks correlations between dreaming and knowledge about the functions of the brain, as well as an understanding of how the brain works during dreaming with respect to memory formation and mental disorders. The study of oneirology can be distinguished from dream interpretation in that the aim is to quantitatively study the process of dreams instead of analyzing the meaning behind them.

== History ==
In the 19th century, two advocates of this discipline were the French sinologists Marquis d'Hervey de Saint Denys and Alfred Maury. The field gained momentum in 1952, when Nathaniel Kleitman and his student Eugene Aserinsky discovered regular cycles. A further experiment by Kleitman and William C. Dement, then another medical student, demonstrated the particular period of sleep during which electrical brain activity, as measured by an electroencephalograph (EEG), closely resembled that of waking, in which the eyes dart about actively. This kind of sleep became known as rapid eye movement (REM) sleep, and Kleitman and Dement's experiment found a correlation of 0.80 between REM sleep and dreaming.

== Field of work ==
Research into dreams includes exploration of the mechanisms of dreaming, the influences on dreaming, and disorders linked to dreaming. Work in oneirology overlaps with neurology and can vary from quantifying dreams to analyzing brain waves during dreaming, to studying the effects of drugs and neurotransmitters on sleeping or dreaming. Though debate continues about the purpose and origins of dreams, there could be great gains from studying dreams as a function of brain activity. For example, knowledge gained in this area could have implications for the treatment of certain mental illnesses.

== Mechanisms of dreaming ==
Dreaming occurs mainly during REM sleep, and brain scans recording brain activity have witnessed heavy activity in the limbic system and the amygdala during this period. Though current research has reversed the myth that dreaming occurs only during REM sleep, it has also shown that the dreams reported in non-rapid eye movement (NREM) and REM differ qualitatively and quantitatively, suggesting that the mechanisms that control each are different.

During REM sleep, researchers theorize that the brain goes through a process known as synaptic efficacy refreshment. This is observed as brain waves self-firing during sleep, in slow cycles at a rate of around 14 Hz, and is believed to serve the purpose of consolidating recent memories and reinforcing old memories. In this type of brain stimulation, the dreaming that occurs is a by-product of the process.

=== Stages of sleep ===
During normal sleep cycles, humans alternate between normal, NREM sleep and REM sleep. The brain waves characteristic of dreaming that are observed during REM sleep are the most commonly studied in dream research because most dreaming occurs during REM sleep.

=== REM sleep ===
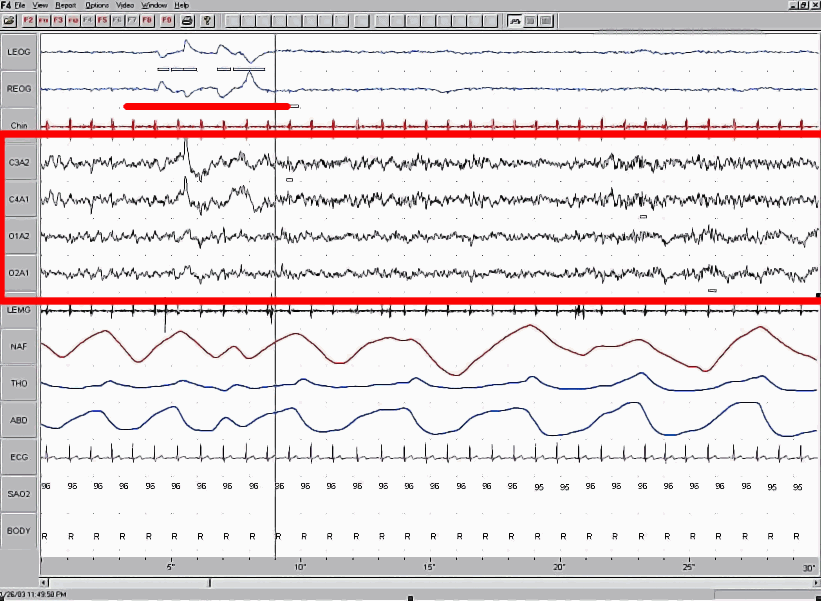
EEG showing brainwaves during REM sleep

In 1952, Eugene Aserinsky discovered REM sleep while working in the surgery of his PhD advisor. Aserinsky noticed that the sleepers' eyes fluttered beneath their closed eyelids, later using a polygraph machine to record their brain waves during these periods. In one session, he awakened a subject who was wailing and crying out during REM and confirmed his suspicion that dreaming was occurring. In 1953, Aserinsky and his advisor published the ground-breaking study in Science.

Accumulated observation shows that dreams are strongly associated with REM sleep, during which an electroencephalogram shows brain activity to be most like wakefulness. While REMS is associated with dreaming, not all REMS periods result in reported dreams, and not all dreams occur during REMS. Participant-nonremembered dreams during NREM are normally more mundane in comparison. During a typical lifespan, a human spends a total of about six years dreaming (which is about two hours each night). Most dreams last only 5 to 20 minutes. It is unknown where in the brain dreams originate, if there is a single origin for dreams, if multiple portions of the brain are involved, or what the purpose of dreaming is for the body or mind.

During REM sleep, the release of certain neurotransmitters is completely suppressed. As a result, motor neurons are not stimulated, a condition known as REM atonia. This prevents dreams from resulting in dangerous movements of the body.

Animals have complex dreams and are able to retain and recall long sequences of events while they are asleep. Studies show that various species of mammals and birds experience REM during sleep, and follow the same series of sleeping states as humans.

The discovery that dreams take place primarily during a distinctive electrophysiological state of sleep (REM), which can be identified by objective criteria, led to rebirth of interest in this phenomenon. When REM sleep episodes were timed for their duration and subjects awakened to make reports before major editing or forgetting could take place, it was determined that subjects accurately matched the length of time they judged the dream narrative to occupy with the length of REM sleep that preceded the awakening. This close correlation of REM sleep and dream experience was the basis of the first series of reports describing the nature of dreaming: that it is a regular nightly occurrence, rather than an occasional phenomenon, and that it is a high-frequency activity within each sleep period occurring at predictable intervals of approximately every 60–90 minutes in all humans throughout the life span.

REM sleep episodes and the dreams that accompany them lengthen progressively across the night, with the first episode the shortest, of approximately 10–12 minutes duration, and the second and third episodes increasing to 15–20 minutes. Dreams at the end of the night may last typically 15 minutes, although these may be experienced as several distinct stories due to momentary arousals interrupting sleep as the night ends.

Dream reports can normally be made 50% of the time when an awakening occurs prior to the end of the first REM period. This rate of retrieval is increased to about 99% when awakenings occur during the last REM period of the night. This increase in the ability to recall appears to be related to intensification across the night in the vividness of dream imagery, colors and emotions. The dream story itself in the last REM period is farthest from reality, containing more bizarre elements, and it is these properties, coupled with the increased likelihood of morning waking review to take place, that heighten the chance of recall of the last dream.

== Definition of a dream ==
The definition of dream used in quantitative research is defined through four base components:

1. a form of thinking that occurs under minimal brain direction, external stimuli are blocked, and the part of the brain that recognizes self shuts down
2. a form of experience that we believed we experience through our senses
3. something memorable
4. have some interpretation of experience by self

In summary, a dream, as defined by G. William Domhoff and Adam Schneider, is "a report of a memory of a cognitive experience that happens under the kinds of conditions that are most frequently produced in a state called 'sleep.'"

=== Authentic dreaming ===
Authentic dreams are defined by their tendency to occur "within the realm of experience" and reflect actual memories or experiences the dreamer can relate to. Authentic dreams are believed to be the side effect of synaptic efficacy refreshment that occurs without errors. Research suggests that the brain stimulation that occurs during dreaming authentic dreams is significant in reinforcing neurological pathways, serving as a method for the mind to "rehearse" certain things during sleep.

=== Illusory dreaming ===
Illusory dreams are defined as dreams that contain impossible, incongruent, or bizarre content and are hypothesized to stem from memory circuits accumulating efficacy errors. In theory, old memories having undergone synaptic efficacy refreshment multiple times throughout one's lifetime result in accumulating errors that manifest as illusory dreams when stimulated. Qualities of illusory dreaming have been linked to delusions observed in mental disorders. Illusory dreams are believed to most likely stem from older memories that experience this accumulation of errors in contrast to authentic dreams that stem from more recent experiences.

== Influences on dreaming ==
One aspect of dreaming studied is the capability to externally influence the contents of dreams with various stimuli. One such successful connection was made to the olfactory system, influencing the emotions of dreams through a smell stimulus. Their research has shown that the introduction of a positive smelling stimulus (roses) induced positive dreams while negative smelling stimulus (rotten eggs) induced negative dreams.

=== Memories and experience ===
Though there is much debate within the field about the purpose of dreaming, a leading theory involves the consolidation of memories and experiences that occurs during REM sleep. The electric involuntary stimulus the brain undergoes during sleep is believed to be a basis for a majority of dreaming. Research suggests that dreams, especially during REM sleep, help consolidate memories by integrating new information with existing memories. This process may prioritize emotionally significant or unresolved experiences.

The link between memory, sleep, and dreams becomes more significant in studies analyzing memory consolidation during sleep. Research has shown that NREM sleep is responsible for the consolidation of facts and episodes in contrast to REM sleep that consolidates more emotionally related aspects of memory. The correlation between REM and emotional consolidation could be interpreted as the reason why dreams are of such an emotional nature and produce strong reactions from humans.

=== Interpersonal attachment ===
In addition to the conscious role people are aware of memory and experience playing in dreaming, unconscious effects such as health of relationships factor into the types of dreams the brain produces. Of the people analyzed, those suffering from "insecure attachments" were found to dream with more frequency and more vividly than those who were evaluated to have "secure attachments".

=== Drugs affecting dreaming ===
Correlations between the usage of drugs and dreaming have been documented, particularly the use of drugs, such as sedatives, and the suppression of dreaming because of drugging effects on the cycles and stages of sleep while not allowing the user to reach REM. Drugs used for their stimulating properties (cocaine, methamphetamine, and ecstasy) have been shown to also decrease the restorative properties of REM sleep and its duration.

== Dreaming disorders ==
Dreaming disorders are difficult to quantify due to the ambiguous nature of dreaming. However, dreaming disorders can be linked to psychological disorders such as post-traumatic stress disorder expressed as nightmares. Research into dreaming also suggests similarity and links in illusory dreaming and delusions.

=== Post-traumatic stress disorder ===
Diagnostic symptoms include re-experiencing original trauma(s), by means of flashbacks or nightmares; avoidance of stimuli associated with the trauma; and increased arousal, such as difficulty falling or staying asleep, anger, and hypervigilance.

Links to post-traumatic stress disorder (PTSD) and dreaming have been made in studying the flashbacks or nightmares the victims would suffer. Measurement of the brain waves exhibited by the subjects experiencing these episodes showed great similarity between those of dreaming. The drugs used to treat those suffering from these symptoms of flashbacks and nightmares would suppress not only these traumatic episodes but also any other sort of dreaming function.

=== Schizophrenia ===
The symptoms of schizophrenia involve abnormalities in the perception or expression of reality primarily focused on delusions and hallucinations.

The delusions experienced by those with schizophrenia have been likened to the experience of illusory dreams that have come to be interpreted by the subject as actual experiences. Additional research into medication to suppress symptoms of schizophrenia have also shown to influence the REM cycle of those taking the medication and as a result influence the patterns of sleep and dreaming in the subjects.

== See also ==
- The Lathe of Heaven
- Carl Jung
- Sigmund Freud
- Dream
- Dreamwork
- Dreams in analytical psychology
- Dreaming (journal)
- Embodied imagination
- Lucid dreaming
- Oneiromancy
- Oneironautics
- Unconscious mind
- International Association for the Study of Dreams (IASD)
