= Treasure ship =

Treasure ship or treasure fleet may refer to:

- Chinese treasure ship, a type of large wooden ship in the fleet of admiral Zheng He, 15th-century Ming dynasty
- Spanish treasure fleet, 1566–1790, a convoy system in the Spanish Empire transporting treasure from its territories

- 1715 Treasure Fleet, a Spanish fleet caught in a hurricane near Florida, United States

- Takarabune, mythical Japanese ship
