= Patricia Garfield =

American writer

Patricia L. Garfield was an American academic specializing in the study of dreams, specifically the cognitive processes underpinning them. She was the author of 10 books covering a broad range of dream topics. These topics include: nightmares, children's dreams, healing through dreams and dream-related art. Her best-known work is “Creative Dreaming.” Originally published in 1974 it was revised and reprinted again in 1995. Her Ph.D in psychology was from Temple University.

Garfield was one of the six co-founders of the International Association for the Study of Dreams (IASD), originally called the Association for the Study of Dreams (ASD). The IASD is a non-profit, international, multidisciplinary organization dedicated to the “pure and applied investigation of dreams and dreaming.” Garfield was the President of the ASD from 1998 to 1999. She died on November 22, 2021, at the age of 87.

== Works ==
- Delfine the Dream Girl. Lulu.com. 2011. ISBN 9781257014118.
- Mourning Dove: Dream Poems, Numina Books, 2007.
- Dream Catcher : A Young Person's Journal for Exploring Dreams. Tundra Books. 2003. ISBN 9780887766619.
- The Dream Book: A Young Person's Guide to Understanding Dreams. Tundra Books. 2002. ISBN 9780615644127. – Non-fiction winner of the 2002 Parents' Guide Media Award, nominated for the Young Hoosier's Book Award 2004-2005
- The Universal Dream Key. Harper Collins. 2009. ISBN 9780061857379.
- The Dream Messenger : How Dreams of the Departed Bring Healing Gifts. Simon & Schuster. 1997. ISBN 9780684813592.
- Barrett, Deirdre, ed. (1996). "Dreams in bereavement". Trauma and dreams. Harvard University Press. pp. 186–211.
- Creative Dreaming: Plan And Control Your Dreams to Develop Creativity, Overcome Fears, Solve Problems, and Create a Better Self, Simon & Schuster, first printed in 1974, reprinted with 19 domestic printings and nine foreign editions in 1976. Revised and reprinted in 1995. – Psychology Today book club alternate selection
- The Healing Power of Dreams, Simon & Schuster, 1991, with two foreign editions.
- Women's Bodies, Women's Dreams, Ballantine Books, 1988.
- Garfield, P. (June 1987). "Nightmares in the sexually abused female teenager". Psychiatric Journal of the University of Ottawa. 12 (2): 93–97. PMID 3303090 – via PsycNET.
- Your Child's Dreams, Ballantine Books, 1984, three foreign editions.
- Pathway to Ecstasy: The Way of the Dream Mandala, Holt, Rinehart and Winston, 1979, one foreign edition, Prentice Hall, 1989, trade edition.
- Garfield, Patricia L. (1973). "Keeping a longitudinal dream record". Psychotherapy. 10 (3): 223–228. doi:10.1037/h0087580.
