= Jayne Gackenbach =

Canadian psychologist

Jayne Gackenbach (born May 24, 1946) is a dream researcher whose focus is lucid dreaming and other altered states of consciousness. She holds a Ph.D. in Experimental Psychology. She attended Virginia Commonwealth University, graduating in 1978, and went on to research at the University of Northern Iowa for 11 years and then moved to Canada. Her most recent research focuses on video game players and the development of consciousness.

She currently is an Emeritus professor at MacEwan University and also teaches part-time at Athabasca University in Edmonton, Alberta, Canada. She was an adjunct faculty member with Saybrook Graduate School and Research Center. She is the author of several books on dreaming and the Internet. She is a former president of the International Association for the Study of Dreams

== Bibliography ==
- Sleep and Dreams: A Sourcebook. Garland Publishers (1986). Ed.
- Conscious Mind, Sleeping Brain. Plenum Publishers (1988). Ed. with Dr. Stephen LaBerge.
- Control Your Dreams: How Lucid Dreaming Can Help You Uncover Hidden Desires. Harper-Collins, ISBN 9780060159337 (1989). With Jane Bosveld.
- Dream Imagery: A Call to Mental Arms. Baywood Publishers (1991). Ed.
- Psychology and the Internet: Intrapersonal, Interpersonal and Transpersonal Implications. Academic Press (1998). Ed.

As contributor:

- Exploring the Collective Unconscious in the Age of Digital Media, Ed. Schafer, Stephen Brock
