= Psychic cost =

A psychic cost is a subset of social costs that specifically represent the costs of added stress or losses to quality of life. In managerial economics and marketing, psychic costs "measure the stress of having to think about a transaction". In the early 2000s, one of the important psychic costs are the "search costs" of hunting for content that interests us on the Internet. Psychic costs should not be confused for psychic activity, which is when an individual claims to use extra-sensory perception.

== Types ==
=== Managerial economics ===
In managerial economics, economists examine the issue of psychic costs and benefits. An example of a psychic cost is the guilt that a US-restaurant-goer feels if they do not make a voluntary tip to a waiter. There is no requirement for the client to give the tip, but if they do not, they may feel bad when they leave; to avoid this psychic cost, people are inclined to tip, even if the service was sub-standard. On the other hand, a psychic benefit occurs when one of the rewards of an action or choice are non-monetary.

Some jobs pay poorly, such as beach resorts, guitar stores, model train stores, and small colleges, but they always have applicants, because the jobs provide a substantial psychic benefit to the applicants. Seaside resorts such as Club Med pay poorly, but young adults find the prospect of living in a tropical sea resort to be very attractive. Special interest stores such as guitar stores and model railroad stores usually have small margins, and they cannot afford good wages; however, for a guitar enthusiast or a model railroad hobbyist, working in these types of stores is very rewarding, because they are surrounded by other enthusiasts, and they are respected for their knowledge of these areas. Teaching in a small college does not pay well, but new PhD graduates still want to work at these institutions, because it is so pleasant to live in a small town and work in a park-like campus filled with young people and because there is so much competition for tenure-track positions at more prestigious schools.

Stores often introduce strategies to reduce customers' perceived psychic costs, because these can cause customers to delay or forgo purchases that they are considering. Customers have many areas of perceived psychic costs in regards to making purchases. They may be worried that there will be a sale after they buy the item, in which case they will pay a higher price. For mechanical items such as cars and appliances, customers may be worried about getting a mechanically-faulty "lemon" or a product that does not suit their needs.

For technological items, customers may be concerned that the product may not be compatible with their computer or hardware. To reduce these perceived psychic costs, and encourage customers to make purchases, businesses have developed many strategies, including exchange policies, which allow customers to return the product and exchange it for a similar model within 30 days; return policies, which allow the return of the item with money back; service guarantees, which promise technical support or in-home technician visits; and price guarantees, which promise to refund the difference should their store or a competitor drop the price within a certain period.

During the holiday period, some shoppers find gift-buying very stressful, because they are concerned that gift recipients will not like the gift, either because it is the wrong size, or because it is not suitable; to counter this psychic risk, stores offer "gift receipts" which allow a recipient to return the item and exchange it, and gift cards, which the recipient can use for any item they want. For big-ticket items, such as cars, the purchaser may be worried about all of the upfront costs such as the down payment and registration, along with the new finance payments; dealers have responded with promotions in which the buyer does not have to make the first one or two payments, which gives them "breathing room" and makes them feel more comfortable about buying a costly vehicle. Similar promotions are used by apartment building managers, who offer "first month free" deals for people who sign a one-year lease.

=== Minorities and immigrants ===
In The Psychic Cost of Segregation, a 1954 article by James W. Prothro and Charles U. Smith of Clark Atlanta University, the authors examined the impact of segregation on the personalities of black Americans. An example of the psychic cost is that some white people still feel fear of blacks, which can make it hard for black people to get jobs or apartments in white-dominated neighbourhoods. As well, for business owners with mainly black clientele, some white clients may not come into their restaurant or theater because of perceptions that it may not be safe. In Michael Spence's model, black students in a biracial university face psychic costs, such as the stigma of "acting white" to convince the admissions committee that they will be a good student, or the threat of stereotyping. Research on discrimination against employees has indicated that in businesses with white employees and black employees, the white employees may get better tips.

Research on illegal immigration indicates that illegal immigrants face psychic costs from the whole ordeal of being smuggled across a border, using false papers, lying to border officials, hiding from border patrols, and avoiding detection once they are living in their new country.

=== Other types ===
Slate writer Steven Landsburg argues that "psychic costs shouldn't count because they're too easy to exaggerate. Anyone can claim to have suffered $1 million worth of emotional distress, but we have no way of knowing which claims are simply fabricated." As well, he claims that a second problem with "... counting psychic harm is that once you start counting it, people train themselves to start feeling it". In Mark A. Runco and Ruth Richards' book Eminent Creativity, Everyday Creativity, and Health, they argue that creative people face psychic costs when they are thinking up new ideas, because the mental process drains them emotionally, and because there is a social stigma associated with being different, and being an artist. In the article Putting a Price Tag on Friends, Relatives, and Neighbours, N Powdthavee argues that there are substantial psychic costs associated with being unemployed or separated from a marriage partner by divorce, because these situations reduce the social ties that keep us emotionally healthy.

Psychologist and former U.S. Army officer David Allen Grossman argues that only a small fraction of soldiers kill during warfare, because the soldiers have an innate resistance to killing a fellow human being. He claims that soldiers during World War II resisted by purposely firing above their target or not firing their rifles. When the military realized that soldiers faced such high psychic costs from killing people, they began developing strategies to encourage more soldiers to kill their targets. Nevertheless, after the Vietnam War, one of the impacts of killing enemy soldiers was that US soldiers faced post-traumatic stress syndrome. Brigadier General S.L.A. Marshall concluded in his book, Men Against Fire, (1946, 1978), that "only 15 to 20 percent of the individual riflemen in World War II fired their weapons at an exposed enemy soldier". Over the centuries, armies have developed a range of "tactical and mechanical mechanisms to enable or force combatants to overcome their resistance to killing".

Research on tax evasion shows that tax cheaters may face psychic costs from their deception, because they feel guilty about not paying their fair share for the services that they use. These psychic costs may also be from fear of shame if they are prosecuted for tax evasion and damage to their reputation; with these psychic costs, taxpayers may even pass up fairly low-risk opportunities to hide income from the taxman.

David Hemenway of Harvard School of Public Health claims that when some people in a community own guns, it "imposes psychic costs on most other members of the community". He claims that "eighty-five percent of non-gun-owners report they would feel less safe if more people in their community acquired guns; only 8% would feel more safe". This is purportedly because non gun-owners would worry about guns being used in the neighbourhood.

As the monetary costs of information and digital information fall (e.g., downloadable music recordings, magazine articles, etc.) towards zero, the main impediments to a transaction are becoming non-monetary factors such as search costs and psychic costs. Search costs are the time and effort costs of finding something. If a person has to search through a poorly-catalogued list of songs on the Internet, it may take hours to find the song that they want. Even if the song is free to download, they have to spend a lot of free time to find that song. Obtaining this "free" downloadable song may impose other psychic costs that make a person worry. The song file may have to be reformatted to work with one's media player and it may have to be screened for viruses or spyware.

== See also ==
- Human factors and ergonomics
