= Abbie Richards =

American TikToker and comedian

- Born: 1996 (age 29–30)
- Occupations: Online personality; Science communicator

Instagram information
- Page: abbiesr
- Genres: Science communication; Anti-conspiracy
- Website: www.abbiesr.com

Abbie Richards (born 1996) is a misinformation educator and environmental activist whose conspiracy theory charts went viral on Twitter in 2020 and 2021. Richards was included on Forbes 30 Under 30 in 2023, in the category of Consumer Technology. For her work on disinformation, she also received a 2023, WIN WIN Gothenburg Sustainability Award, and a 2024 Mozilla Rise 25 Award.

== Early life and education ==
Richards was born in 1996 and grew up in Newton, Massachusetts. She graduated from Colorado College with a degree in environmental science, and in 2022 she graduated with a masters in climate studies from Wageningen University & Research in the Netherlands.

== Social media career ==
=== Environmental activism ===
Richards is a member of EcoTok, a TikTok collective which focuses on creating environmentalist content. Richards began posting criticism of golf and golf courses on TikTok after running past a golf course in the spring of 2020 and noticing the course's "no trespassing" signs. She told The Daily Dot that "the privatization of green spaces, especially during a pandemic when people need to maximize their distance from one another, made me furious." In January 2021, Richards published an op-ed about golf in Euronews Living.

=== Misinformation education ===
In 2020, Richards created an inverted pyramid chart assessing conspiracy theories from "Grounded in Reality" to "Detached from Reality", which according to journalist David Farrier "went bonkers on Twitter". In 2021, Richards created an updated version of the chart that went viral.

Richards has created TikToks on, and spoken to news outlets about, misinformation and conspiracy theories on the app: including videos promoting QAnon and other antisemitic conspiracy theories; and misleading videos related to the Russian invasion of Ukraine.

=== TikTok research ===
Richards has conducted research on TikTok and its algorithm. One of her reports describes pervasive white supremacist content on the app.

== Personal life ==
As of February 2022, Richards resides in Boston. Richards is also Jewish and queer.
