= Hatsuyume =

First dream of the year in Japanese culture

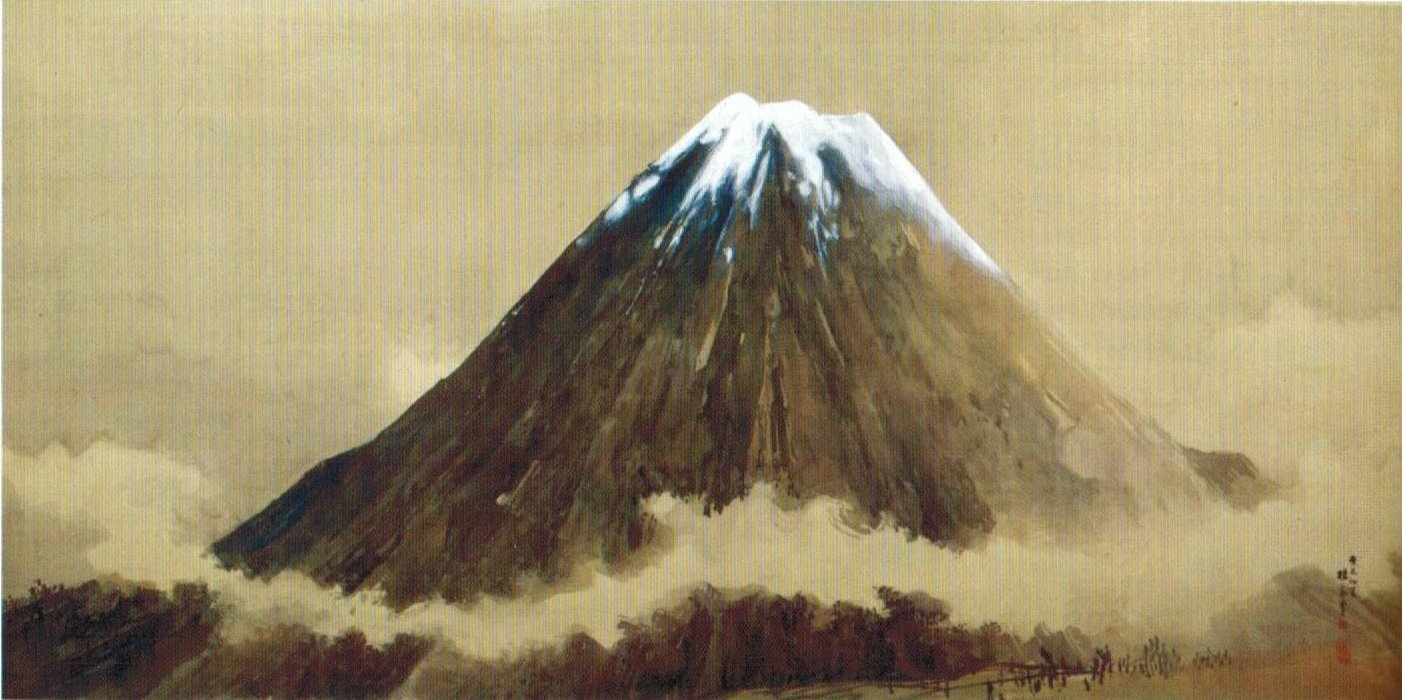
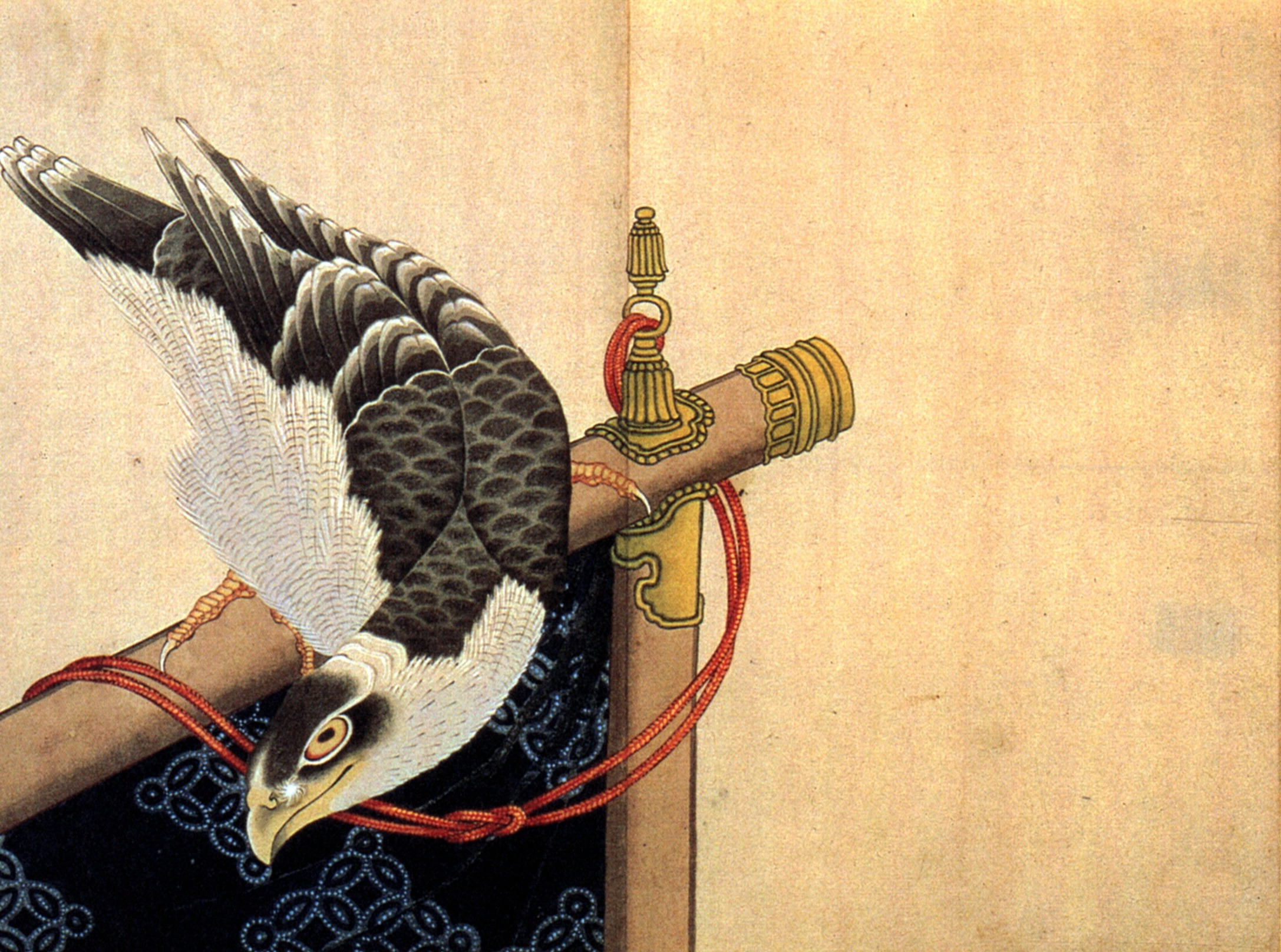
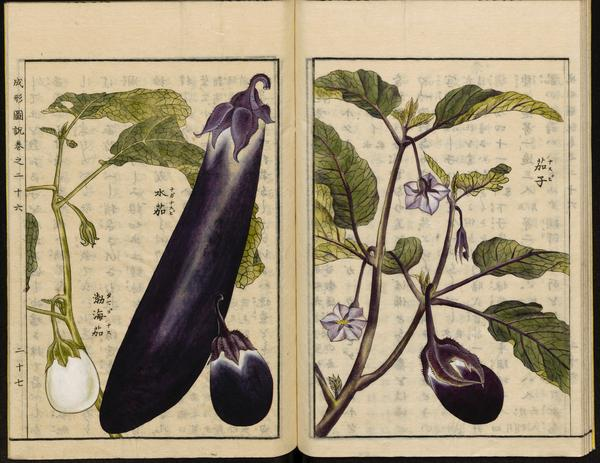
The three auspicious subjects of the first dream of the year: Mount Fuji, a hawk, and an eggplant

In Japanese culture, a hatsuyume (Japanese: 初夢) is the first dream one has in the new year. Traditionally, the contents of such a dream would foretell the luck of the dreamer in the ensuing year. In Japan, the night of December 31 was often passed without sleeping, so the hatsuyume is often experienced during the night of January 1; the day after the night of the "first dream" is also known as the hatsuyume. This day is January 2 in the Gregorian calendar, but was different in the traditional Japanese calendar.

It is considered to be particularly good luck to dream of Mount Fuji, a hawk, and an eggplant. This belief has been in place since the early Edo period, including mentions in the poetry of Matsuo Bashō. There are various theories regarding the origins as to why this particular combination was considered to be auspicious. One theory suggests that this combination is lucky because Mount Fuji is Japan's highest mountain, the hawk is a clever and strong bird, and the word for eggplant (茄子, nasu or nasubi) suggests achieving something great (成す nasu). Another theory suggests that this combination arose because Mount Fuji, falconry, and early eggplants were favorites of the shōgun Tokugawa Ieyasu.

Although this superstition is well known in Japan, often memorized in the form ichi-Fuji, ni-taka, san-nasubi (一富士、二鷹、三茄子; 1. Fuji, 2. Hawk, 3. Eggplant), the continuation of the list is not as well known. The continuation is yon-sen, go-tabako, roku-zatō (四扇、五煙草、六座頭; 4. Fan, 5. Tobacco, 6. Blind acupressurer). The origins of this trio are less well known, and it is unclear whether they were added after the original three or whether the list of six originated at the same time.

== See also ==
- Japanese New Year
- Ōmisoka (Japanese New Year's Eve)
- Oneiromancy
- Takarabune
