= Big dream =

In Jungian dream analysis, big dreams (German: große Träume) are dreams which have a strong impact on the dreamer and contain heavily archetypal imagery.

== Background ==
According to Carl Jung, these dreams arise from the collective unconscious more than the personal unconscious, that is, their imagery is broadly shared by many people in different cultures. Jung states that these dreams appear more often in during critical phases of change in human life, being early youth, puberty, middle age and as one nears death. These dreams primarily express "eternal human problems", rather than personal issues. Despite this, they serve as milestones along the path to individuation, which includes the integration of the personal ego into a sense of becoming a universal human being. Big dreams are connected to the idea of the Hero's Journey, which Jung describes as the "life of the hero", waypoints along a human life understood in mythological terms.

== Examples ==
Jung gives the example of a man who dreamt of a great snake that guarded a golden bowl in an underground vault. He explains that this image was not based directly on the dreamer's personal experience (although he had once seen a large snake at the zoo), but on archetypal imagery and collective emotion.
