= Takarabune =

Mythical ship in Japanese folklore

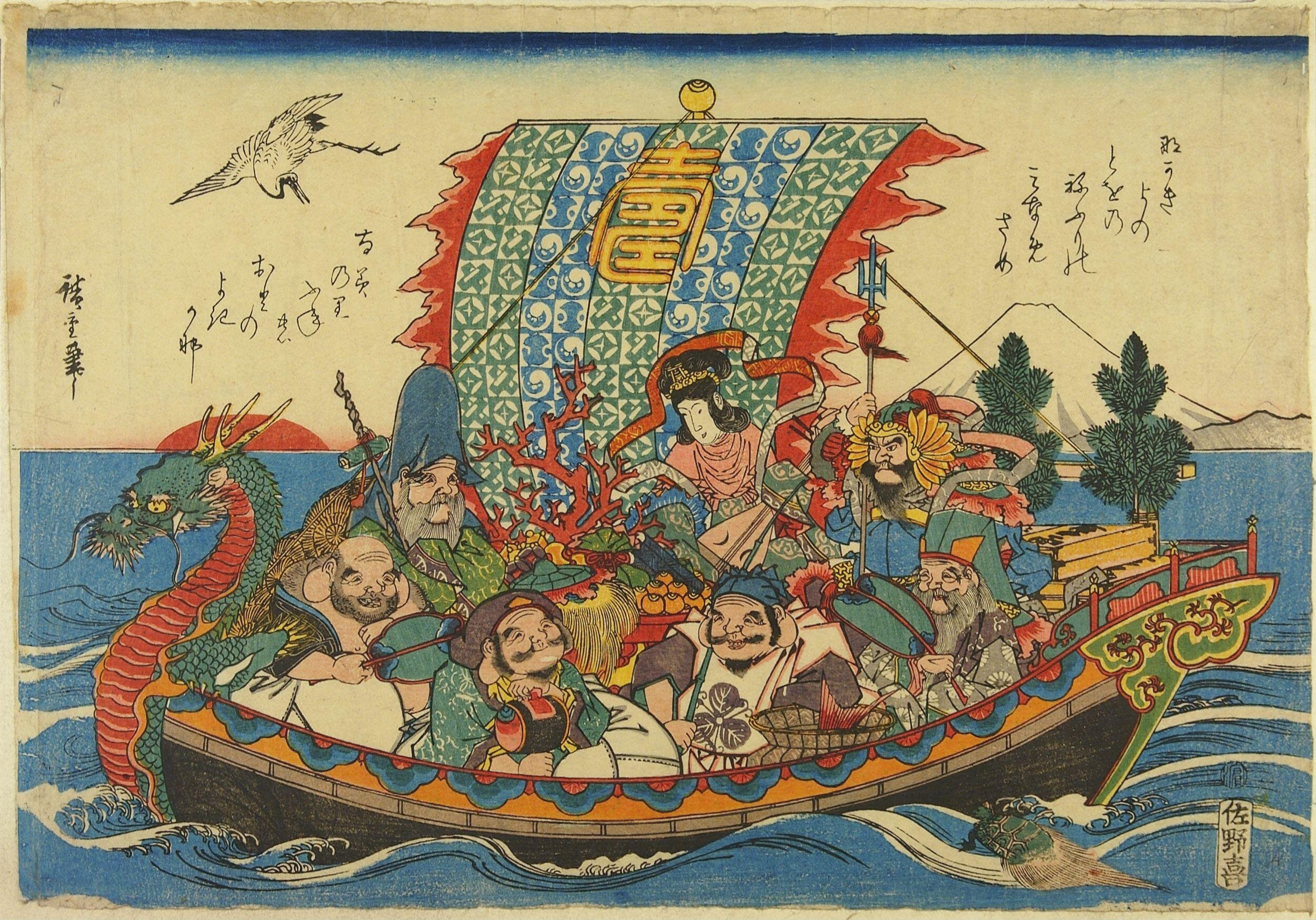
Coloured woodblock print (ukiyo-e) of the Takarabune by Utagawa Hiroshige.

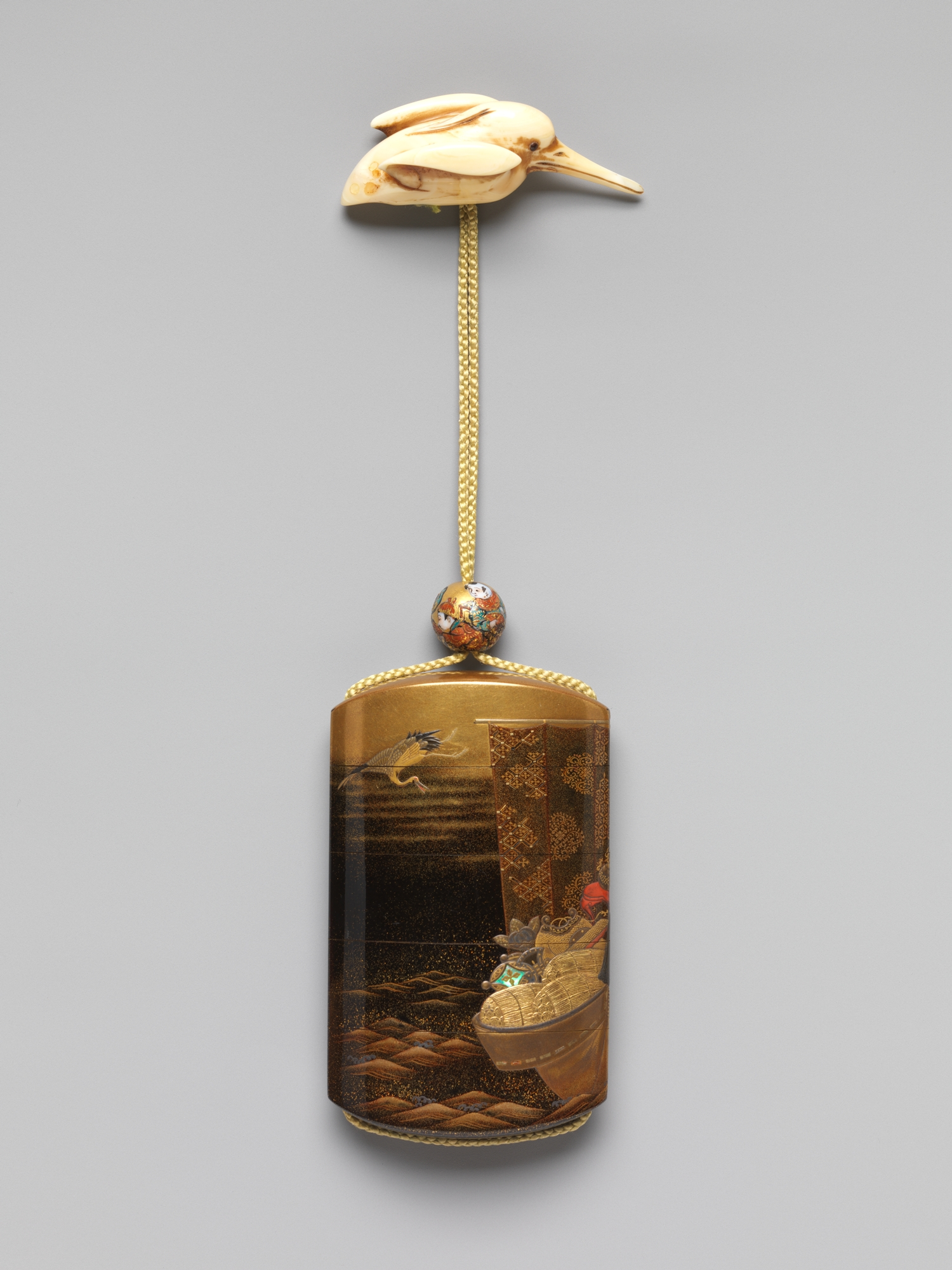
Inro with Takarabune, by Kajikawa Bunryūsai, Edo period, 19th century

In Japanese folklore, the Takarabune (宝船), or "Treasure Ship", is a mythical ship piloted through the heavens by the Seven Lucky Gods during the first three days of the New Year. A picture of the ship forms an essential part of traditional Japanese New Year celebrations.

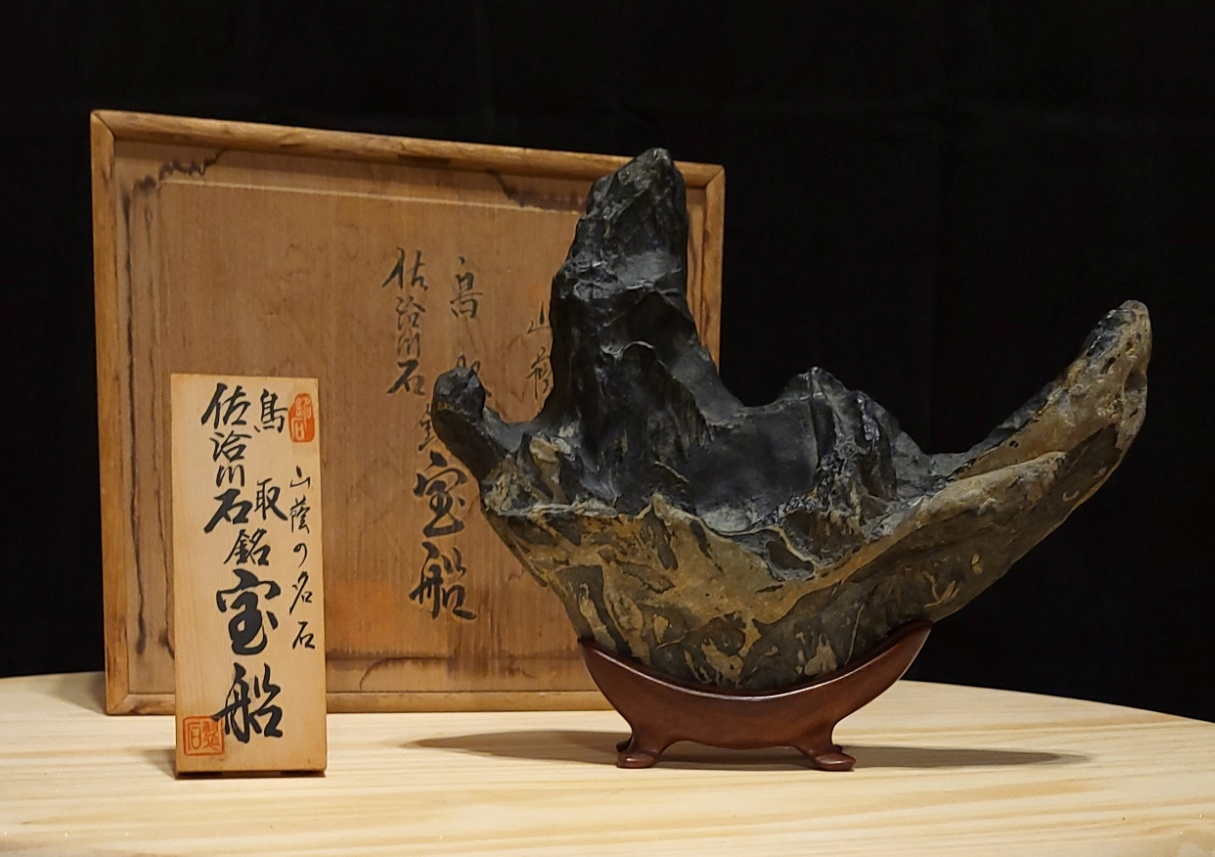
Japanese suiseki stone representing Takarabune.

== The ship ==
During the first three days of the New Year the Seven Lucky Gods are said to pilot through the heavens and into human ports a mythical ship called the Takarabune, or "Treasure Ship". The gods carry with them takaramono (宝物), or treasure things, including the hat of invisibility (隠れ笠, kakuregasa), rolls of brocade (織物, orimono), the inexhaustible purse (金袋 kanebukuro), the secret keys to the treasure shed of the gods (鍵 kagi), the scrolls of books of wisdom and life (巻き物 makimono), the magic mallet (小槌 kozuchi), the lucky raincoat (隠れ蓑, kakuremino), the robe of fairy feathers (羽衣, hagoromo), and the bag of fortune (布袋 nunobukuro).

== Woodblock prints ==
A picture of the ship forms an essential part of traditional Japanese New Year celebrations, and merchants and urban workers also associate it with good fortune in business. According to custom, placing a Takarabune woodblock print beneath a pillow on the night of 2 January may induce a lucky dream – a sign that the year to come will be fortunate. In the event of an unpleasant dream, the print may be disposed of by throwing it into a river.

The custom of putting a picture under the pillow started around the Muromachi period. It was initially popular among the nobility, and spread to commoners during the later Edo period. Street vendors sold cheap woodblock prints, intended for single use.

Many Takarabune prints show a crane above and a turtle below, representative of longevity and felicity, as well as a palindromic poem which tells of a long night in a boat. At dawn, the sound of waves is heard and smooth sailing seen ahead.

== See also ==
- Argo, a ship from the Greek mythology
- Flying Dutchman, a legendary ghost ship
- Hatsuyume, the first dream of a new year according to Japanese folklore
- Mendam Berahi, a legendary ship of Malacca Sultanate
- Prydwen, the legendary ship of King Arthur
