= International Association for the Study of Dreams =

Scientific and professional organization for dream research

- Formation: 1983; 43 years ago
- Type: Nonprofit
- Tax ID no.: 680066783
- Headquarters: Folsom, California, U.S.
- Region served: Global
- Products: Dreaming (journal), 1991-present International Journal of Dream Research, 2008-present
- Services: International Association for the Study of Dreams Conference, 1983-present
- Fields: Dreams, dreams in analytical psychology, oneirology, oneiromancy, lucid dreaming, psychology
- President: Deirdre Barrett, PhD
- Affiliations: American Psychological Association (APA)
- Website: asdreams.org
- Formerly called: Association for the Study of Dreams

The International Association for the Study of Dreams (IASD) is a multi-disciplinary professional nonprofit organization for scientific dream research (oneirology), founded in 1983 and headquartered in the U.S.

International Journal of Dream Research
- Discipline: Psychology, oneirology
- Language: English

Publication details
- History: 2008–present
- Publisher: International Association for the Study of Dreams; Heidelberg University Library servers
- Frequency: Biannual except for conference supplements select years

Standard abbreviations
- ISO 4: Int. J. Dream Res.

Indexing
- ISSN: 1866-7953
- LCCN: 2012243153
- OCLC no.: 456193762

Links
- Journal homepage

The organization was originally named the Association for the Study of Dreams (ASD). (Note: Regarding the name change from Association for the Study of Dreams (ASD) to International Association for the Study of Dreams (IASD) : Association for the Study of Dreams in Merced, California at EIN Tax ID web site; International Association for the Study of Dreams in Folsom, California at EIN Tax ID web site; Both have the same tax ID, 680066783.)

== Scope ==
Attracting "a 'rainbow coalition' of scientists, scholars, therapists, cultural practitioners, artists, and the general public", the organization publishes scientific research across all dream-related subjects, including dreams in analytical psychology, oneirology, dreamwork, oneiromancy, and lucid dreaming via its:

- International Association for the Study of Dreams Conference―annual conference alternating locations across the globe, held since 1984
- Dreaming―a journal published by the American Psychological Association (APA) on behalf of IASD since 1991
- International Journal of Dream Research (IJoDR) (ISSN: 1866–7953)―peer-reviewed, indexed in APA's PsycINFO and Elsevier's Scopus databases since 2008, and published on Heidelberg University Library servers
- Funding and endorsement: The IASD has provided research grants, and has endorsed projects such as an art exhibition in Vienna and Paris from 1999 to 2001 and an associated book, Dreams 1900-2000.

Writing in 1989, psychology professor, Harry T. Hunt states that "on an organizational level, the Sleep Research Society (srs) and its small cluster of researchers focusing on physiological, neurocognitive, and content analysis approaches to dreams have been supplemented by a more eclectic organization, the Association for the Study of Dreams (asp) [sic]. Within ASD, a diverse group of Freudian, Jungian, existential, and other psychologists interested primarily in dream interpretation and 'dreamwork' has banded together with others attempting to relate dreams to altered states of consciousness and transpersonal psychology, and a small number of srs experimenters."

Writing more recently, in 2017, historian and academic, Jonson Miller states that "[t]he IASD is a scholarly association for the study of dreams, including dream interpretation, dreams in culture, creativity and dreams, the physiology of dreaming, and lucid dreaming. They publish two magazines and a newsletter, hold conferences (both traditional and online), and provide classes on dream work. Their website has many useful resources, including bibliographies, videos, podcasts, recordings from past conferences, and even images from dream art exhibitions."

=== Governance ===
The nonprofit has historically been led by the following researchers:

- Gayle Delaney, PhD (1983–85) – IASD co-founder and Oprah dream expert
- Stephen LaBerge, PhD – IASD co-founder, psychophysiologist and lucid dreaming specialist
- Robert Van de Castle (1985–1986)
- Ernest Hartmann, professor, psychoanalyst and sleep researcher (1987–1988)
- Jayne Gackenbach, PhD (1988–1989)
- Stanley Krippner, professor, psychologist and parapsychologist (1993–1994)
- Deirdre Barrett, PhD (1995–96, 2023–24)
- Kelly Bulkeley, PhD (1997–98)
- Patricia Garfield, PhD (1998–99) – IASD co-founder
- Mark Blagrove, professor of psychology and dream researcher (2001–2002)
- Michelle Carr, PhD, dream researcher focused on lucid dreaming and other altered states of consciousness (2021–2023)

== Notable members ==
- G. William Domhoff, PhD – psychologist and author
- Harry Fiss, PhD
- Allan Hobson, MD
- Robert Moss

== Publications ==
- Hoss, Robert J; Gongloff, Robert P, eds. (13 April 2017). Dreams That Change Our Lives: A Publication of The International Association for the Study of Dreams. Krippner, Stanley (Foreword). Chiron Publications. ISBN 978-1-63051-429-7.

== Media appearances ==
- Hoss, Robert J. (5 June 2021). "Dreaming about the IASD Conference with Bob Hoss". The Dream Journal (Audio podcast). Interviewed by Katherine Bell. Santa Cruz: KSQD. Archived from the original on 15 June 2021.

== See also ==
- American Psychological Association
