= Embodied imagination =

Therapeutic form of working with dreams and memories

Embodied imagination is a therapeutic and creative form of working with dreams and memories pioneered by Dutch Jungian psychoanalyst Robert Bosnak and based on principles first developed by Swiss psychiatrist Carl Jung, especially in his work on alchemy, and on the work of American archetypal psychologist James Hillman, who focused on soul as a simultaneous multiplicity of autonomous states.

== Technique ==
The technique of embodied imagination takes dreaming as the paradigm for all work with images. While dreaming, everyone experiences dreams as embodied events in time and space; that is, the dreamer is convinced that he or she is experiencing a real event in a real environment. Bosnak describes how a dream "instantaneously presents a total world, so real that you are convinced you are awake. You don't just think so, you know it in the same way you now know you are awake reading this book." So from the perspective of dreaming, the image is a place. Drawing upon Carl Jung's realization that "the ego complex is not the only complex in the psyche," Hillman described the psyche to be not a singular unified whole defined by the ego point of view, but rather a self-organizing multiplicity of autonomous selves.

== See also ==
- Active imagination
- Alchemy
- Archetypal psychology
- Contemporary dream interpretation
- Divine embodiment
- James Hillman
- Polytheistic myth as psychology
