= Dreaming (journal) =

- Discipline: Psychology, oneirology
- Language: English
- Edited by: Deirdre Barrett

Publication details
- History: 1991–present
- Publisher: American Psychological Association on behalf of the International Association for the Study of Dreams
- Frequency: Quarterly
- Impact factor: 2.212 (2021)

Standard abbreviations
- ISO 4: Dreaming

Indexing
- CODEN: DRMGEW
- ISSN: 1053-0797 (print); 1573-3351 (web)
- LCCN: 91651497
- OCLC no.: 637638137

Links
- Journal homepage; Online access

Dreaming is a peer-reviewed academic journal published by the American Psychological Association on behalf of the International Association for the Study of Dreams. IASD's other peer-reviewed publication, the International Journal of Dream Research (IJoDR) is published on Heidelberg University Library servers.

The Dreaming journal covers research on dreaming, as well as on dreaming from the viewpoint of any of the arts and humanities. The current editor-in-chief is Deirdre Barrett (Harvard Medical School).

== Abstracting and indexing ==
According to the Journal Citation Reports, the journal has a 2020 impact factor of 0.76.

== See also ==
- Dreams in analytical psychology
- Oneirology
