= Louise Ward =

French painter (1849–1930)

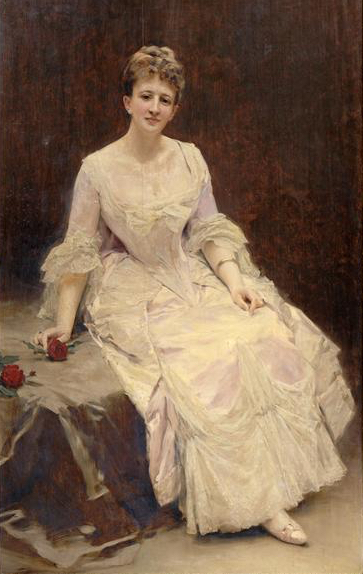
- 1885 portrait by Raimundo de Madrazo y Garreta
- Born: 9 July 1849; Parma, Italy
- Died: 11 February 1930 (aged 80); Paris, France
- Other names: Louise Dubréau; Louise Dubreau; Louise de Ward; Marquise d'Hervey de Saint-Denys; Marquise d'Hervey de Saint-Denis; Louise de Waru; Madame de Waru; Comtesse de Waru
- Occupation: Painter
- Years active: 1875–1899
- Spouse(s): Marie-Jean-Léon, Marquis d'Hervey de Saint Denys (m. 1868; died 1892) Jacques de Waru (m. 1896; died 1911)

Louise Ward, sometimes rendered Louise de Ward (9 July 1849 – 11 February 1930), known in the art world by her pseudonym Louise Dubréau or Louise Dubreau, was a French painter and Parisian society belle.

She was married twice: in 1868 to the Marquis d'Hervey de Saint Denys, who died in 1892, and in 1896 to Count Jacques de Waru, who died in 1911. Marcel Proust, in his In Search of Lost Time, based the character of the Princesse d’Orvillers, also called the Princesse de Nassau, on her.

== Early life and education ==
Ward was born on 9 July 1849 in Parma, Italy, (Note: Some French sources, dating from 1877 or thereafter, state that she was born in Vienna, where her father had been sent in 1849 by the Duke of Parma as minister-plenipotentiary to represent the duchy, and where Emperor Franz Joseph I conferred on him the Austrian title of Baron.) where her father had been stationed as chief minister of the Duke of Parma. Burke's Peerage of 1850 and thereafter indicates that her birth name was Elizabeth Margaret Ward. (Note: French sources, which all date from her 1896 second marriage and thereafter, give her name as Louise Marguerite Elisabeth Ward.)

She was an Austrian baroness who was the daughter of Baron Thomas Ward (Note: Several published sources state that Ward was said to be the illegitimate daughter of the Duke of Parma. At least one French society chronicle said that as an infant, she was baptized by the Duke and Duchess of Parma. Likewise, Marcel Proust's character based on her, the princess d'Orvillers (later called the Princess of Nassau), is described in his Sodom and Gomorrah (1921) as "said to be the illegitimate daughter of the Duke of Parma".) and his wife Louise Genthner, a Viennese commoner whom Thomas Ward had married in 1832.

She was educated in a convent school in France.

== Career ==
After her marriage to a French marquis in 1868, Ward became an accomplished and successful painter in Paris, studying with Pierre Auguste Cot. She signed her paintings "Louise Dubréau", sometimes rendered "Louise Dubreau" or "Louise du Bréau", after her husband d'Hervey's estate Château du Bréau near Dourdan in Seine-et-Oise in the department of Yvelines.

Two of her best-known paintings are The Old Lodger (1877), which was exhibited at the Salon de 1877 and auctioned at Christie's in 2008; and Printemps (1882), which was exhibited at the Salon de 1882.

Her painting Chanteuse des rues (Street Singer) was exhibited at the Salon de 1878. In a lengthy review, Le Correspondant described the singer as clearly dejected and abandoned, and it praised Ward's delicately nuanced depiction. The Revue du Monde Catholique described the depiction as evoking the same feelings as the poor young girls that Alexandre Antigna enjoyed painting, stating "one feels pity for her and would offer her help if one were to encounter her". Ward's Jeanne d'Arc (Joan of Arc) was exhibited at the Salon de 1879, and was described as charming and as emphasizing candor and devotion.

Ward's portrait of her husband, the Marquis d'Hervey de Saint-Denys, was exhibited at the Salon de 1881. Her portrait of Count Friedrich Ferdinand von Beust was widely praised and was exhibited at the Salon de 1883.

== Personal life ==
In 1868, at the age of 18, she married French sinologist Marie-Jean-Léon, Marquis d'Hervey de Saint Denys. Her title became Marquise d'Hervey de Saint-Denys, sometimes rendered Marquise d'Hervey de Saint-Denis. The couple lived in Paris in their mansion at 9 Avenue Bosquet.

In Paris, Ward became a society belle (mondaine) and a grande dame, and was known as a great beauty. Marcel Proust, in his multi-volume novel series In Search of Lost Time, based the Princesse d’Orvillers, also known as the Princesse de Nassau, on her.

Ward's great benefactor in France was the Duchesse de Luynes (1849–1905), also known as Yolande de La Rochefoucauld or Yolande Dalbert. The duchess was also a painter and a fellow student at the studio of Pierre Auguste Cot, where they met. The two became lifelong friends and companions.

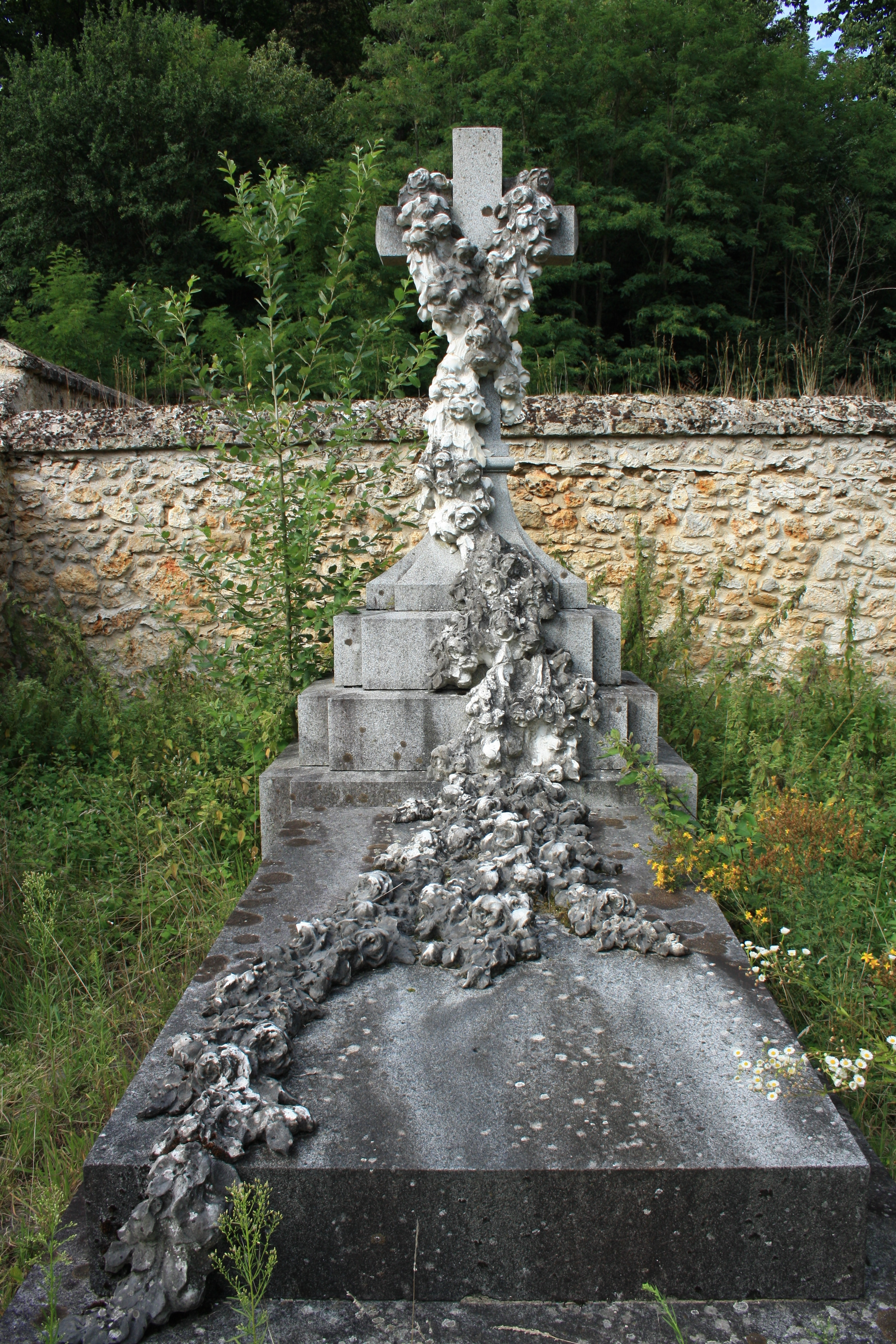
Louise de Waru's tomb in Saint-Forget

Her first husband, Hervey de Saint Denys, died in 1892.

In 1896, Ward remarried, to French aristocrat and Olympic equestrian Count Jacques de Waru (1865–1911). He was described by contemporaries as "a very militant young royalist"; his family had been close to the French monarchy since its restoration in 1804, and his grandfather, Adolphe, had made a personal fortune in banking and served as a regent of the Banque de France from 1856 to 1871.

Ward died in Paris in February 1930, at the age of 80.

She is buried in a large decorative tomb in the small cemetery of the Romanesque church Saint-Ferréol in Saint-Forget in the department of Yvelines.

== Notable works ==
- Ne dine jamais en ville [Never dine out] (known in English as The Old Lodger) (1877)
- Chanteuse des rues [Street Singer] (1878)
- Jeanne d'Arc (1879)
- Marchand de marrons [Chestnut Seller] (1880)
- Printemps (1882)
- Portrait of Count Friedrich Ferdinand von Beust (1882)

== Gallery ==
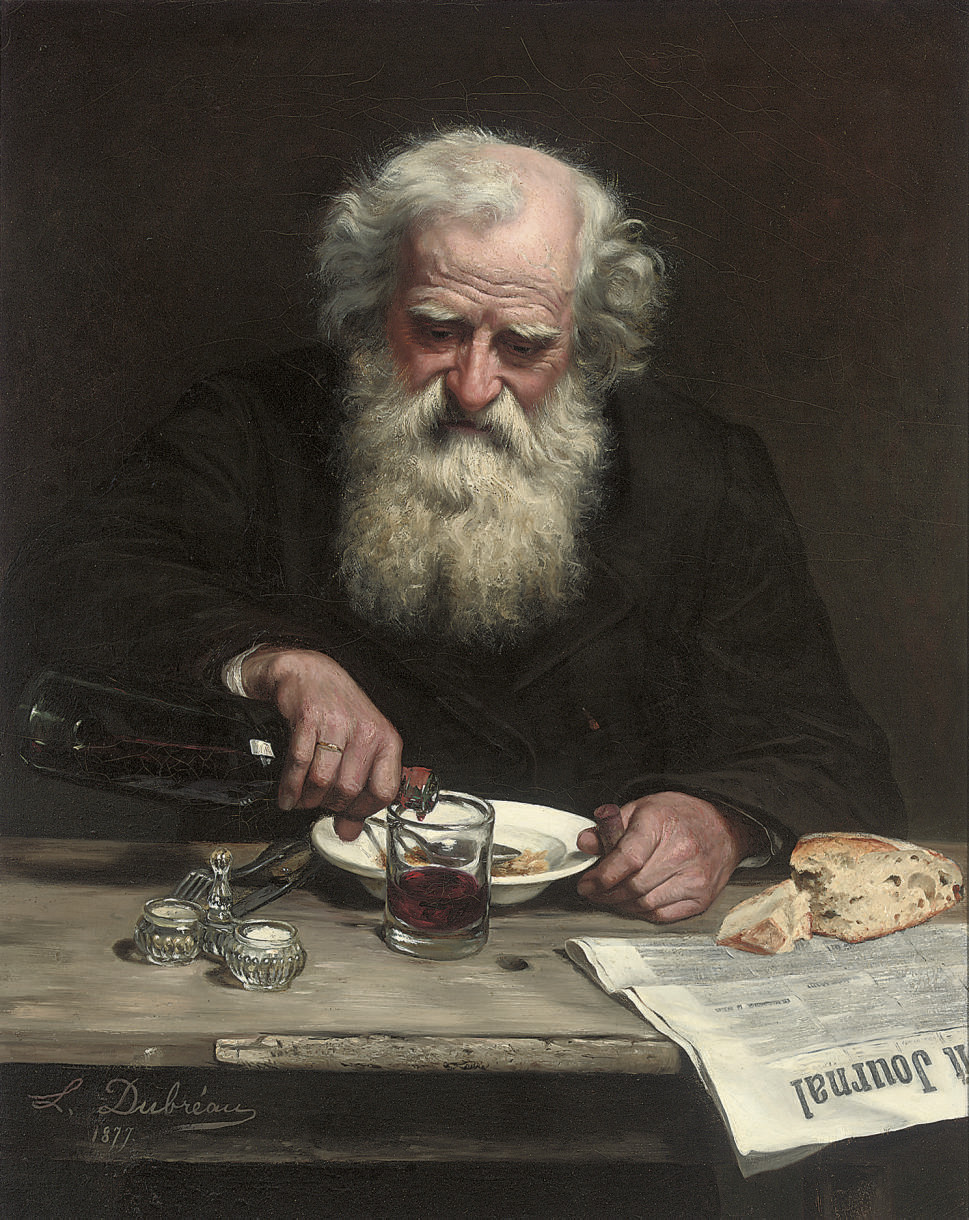
Ne dine jamais en ville [Never dine out], known in English as The Old Lodger (1877)

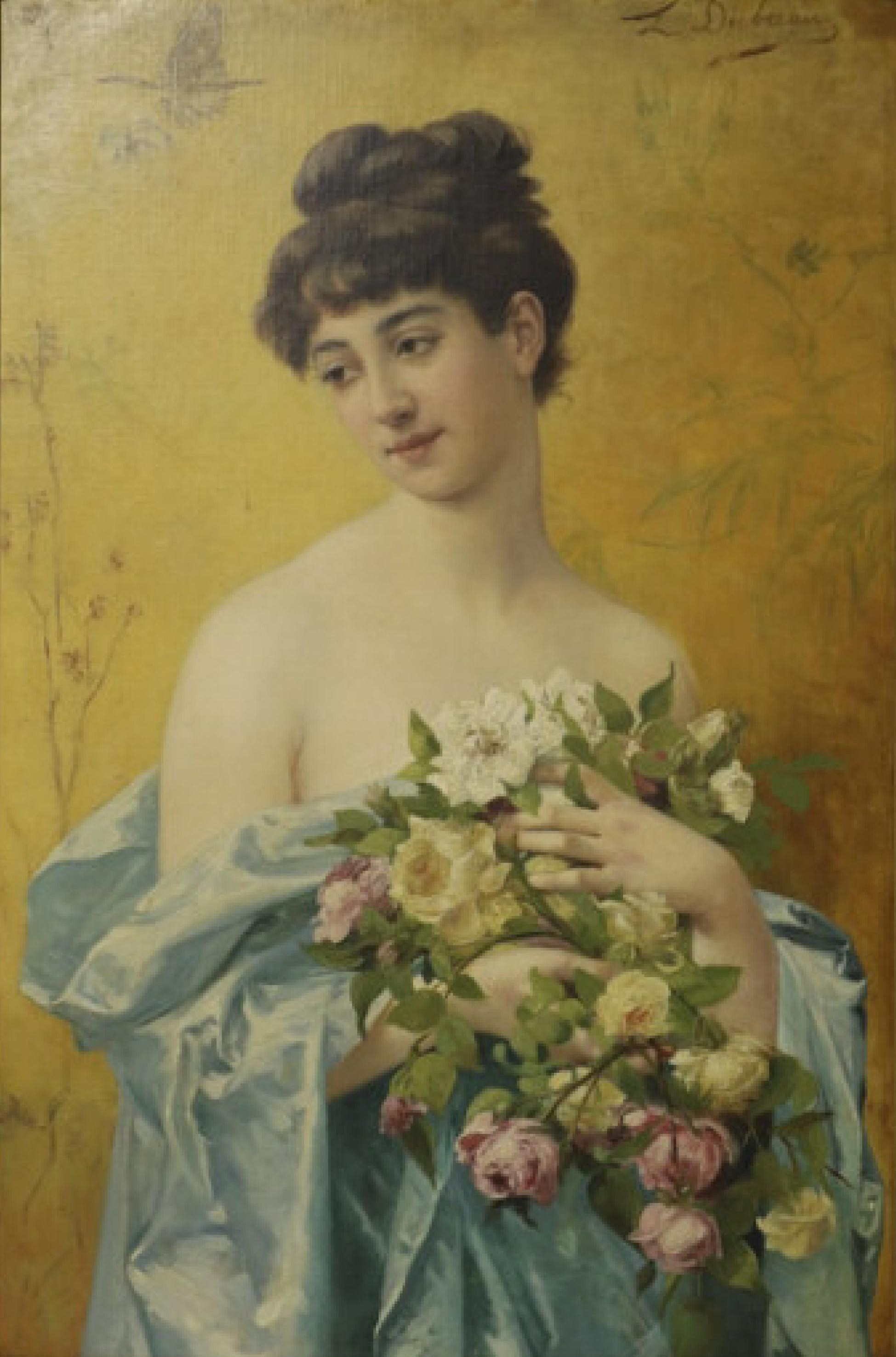
Printemps (1882)
