= False awakening =

Vivid and convincing dream about awakening from sleep

A false awakening is a vivid scenario in which a person dreams that they have woken up, while still actually asleep. After a false awakening, subjects often dream they are performing their daily morning routine such as showering or eating breakfast. False awakenings, particularly those in which individuals dream they have awakened from a sleep that involved dreaming, take on aspects of a double dream or a dream within a dream. A classic example in fiction is the double false awakening of the protagonist in Gogol's Portrait (1835).

Some studies have shown that false awakenings are frequently related to lucid dreaming, often transitioning into one another. The key distinction is that during a lucid dream, the dreamer recognizes they are dreaming, while in a false awakening, this awareness is absent.

== Related concepts ==
=== Lucidity ===
A false awakening may occur following a dream or following a lucid dream (one in which the dreamer has been aware of dreaming). Particularly, if the false awakening follows a lucid dream, the false awakening may turn into a "pre-lucid dream", that is, one in which the dreamer may start to wonder if they are really awake and may or may not come to the correct conclusion. In a study by Harvard psychologist Deirdre Barrett, 2,000 dreams from 200 subjects were examined and it was found that false awakenings and lucidity were significantly more likely to occur within the same dream or within different dreams of the same night. False awakenings often preceded lucidity as a cue, but they could also follow the realization of lucidity, often losing it in the process.

=== False awakenings loops ===
Because the mind still dreams after a false awakening, there may be more than one false awakening in a single dream. Subjects may dream they wake up, eat breakfast, brush their teeth, and so on; suddenly awake again in bed (still in a dream), begin morning rituals again, awaken again, and so forth.

The philosopher Bertrand Russell claimed to have experienced "about a hundred" false awakenings in succession while coming around from a general anesthetic.

=== Protoconscious world ===
Giorgio Buzzi suggests that false awakenings may indicate the occasional re-appearing of a vestigial (or anyway anomalous) REM sleep in the context of disturbed or hyperaroused sleep (lucid dreaming, sleep paralysis, or situations of high anticipation). This peculiar form of REM sleep permits the replay of unaltered experiential memories, thus providing a unique opportunity to study how waking experiences interact with the hypothesized predictive model of the world. In particular, it could permit to catch a glimpse of the protoconscious world without the distorting effect of ordinary REM sleep.

In accordance with the proposed hypothesis, a high prevalence of false awakenings could be expected in children, whose "REM sleep machinery" might be less developed.

==== Gibson's hypothesis ====
Gibson's dream protoconsciousness theory states that false awakening is shaped on some fixed patterns depicting real activities, especially the day-to-day routine. False awakening is often associated with highly realistic environmental details of the familiar events like the day-to-day activities or autobiographic and episodic moments.

== Symptoms ==
=== Realism and non-realism ===
Certain aspects of life may be dramatized or out of place in false awakenings. Things may seem wrong: details, like the painting on a wall, not being able to talk or difficulty reading (reportedly, reading in lucid dreams is often difficult or impossible).

== Types ==
Celia Green suggested a distinction should be made between two types of false awakening:

=== Type 1 ===
Type 1 is the more common, in which the dreamer seems to wake up, but not necessarily in realistic surroundings; that is, not in their own bedroom. A pre-lucid dream may ensue. More commonly, dreamers will believe they have awakened, and then either genuinely wake up in their own bed or "fall back asleep" in the dream.

A common false awakening is a "late for work" scenario. A person may "wake up" in a typical room, with most things looking normal, and realize they overslept and missed the start time at work or school. Clocks, if found in the dream, will show time indicating that fact. The resulting panic is often strong enough to truly awaken the dreamer (much like from a nightmare).

Another common Type 1 example of false awakening can result in bedwetting. In this scenario, the dreamer has had a false awakening and while in the state of dream has performed all the traditional behaviors that precede urinating – arising from bed, walking to the bathroom, and sitting down on the toilet or walking up to a urinal. The dreamer may then urinate and suddenly wake up to find they have wet themselves.

=== Type 2 ===
The Type 2 false awakening seems to be considerably less common. Green characterized it as follows:

The subject appears to wake up in a realistic manner but to an atmosphere of suspense. ... The dreamer's surroundings may at first appear normal, and they may gradually become aware of something uncanny in the atmosphere, and perhaps of unwanted [unusual] sounds and movements, or they may "awake" immediately to a "stressed" and "stormy" atmosphere. In either case, the end result would appear to be characterized by feelings of suspense, excitement or apprehension.

Charles McCreery draws attention to the similarity between this description and the description by the German psychopathologist Karl Jaspers (1923) of the so-called "primary delusionary experience" (a general feeling that precedes more specific delusory belief). Jaspers wrote:

Patients feel uncanny and that there is something suspicious afoot. Everything gets a new meaning. The environment is somehow different—not to a gross degree—perception is unaltered in itself but there is some change which envelops everything with a subtle, pervasive and strangely uncertain light. ... Something seems in the air which the patient cannot account for, a distrustful, uncomfortable, uncanny tension invades him.

McCreery suggests this phenomenological similarity is not coincidental and results from the idea that both phenomena, the Type 2 false awakening and the primary delusionary experience, are phenomena of sleep. He suggests that the primary delusionary experience, like other phenomena of psychosis such as hallucinations and secondary or specific delusions, represents an intrusion into waking consciousness of processes associated with stage 1 sleep. It is suggested that the reason for these intrusions is that the psychotic subject is in a state of hyperarousal, a state that can lead to what Ian Oswald called "microsleeps" in waking life.

Other researchers doubt that these are clearly distinguished types, as opposed to being points on a subtle spectrum.

== Experimental descriptions ==
The clinical and neurophysiological descriptions of false awakening are rare. One notable report by Takeuchi et al., was considered by some experts as a case of false awakening. It depicts a hypnagogic hallucination of an unpleasant and fearful feeling of presence in sleeping lab with perception of having risen from the bed. The polysomnography showed abundant trains of alpha rhythm on EEG (sometimes blocked by REMs mixed with slow eye movements and low muscle tone). Conversely, the two experiences of FA monitored here were close to regular REM sleep. Even quantitative analysis clearly shows theta waves predominantly, suggesting that these two experiences are a product of a dreaming rather than a fully conscious brain.

The clinical and neurophysiological characteristics of false awakening are

1. One does not feel paralysed.
2. One feels that the surroundings are familiar.
3. Frequently associated with anxiety.
4. The EEG shows low Alpha and beta bands but high delta and theta bands.
5. The EOG shows the presence of spontaneous REMs.

== See also ==
- Inception, a 2010 science fiction film
- Dream argument
- Lucid dream
- Sleep paralysis
- The Butterfly Dream
- "The Pool Guy", an episode of The Twilight Zone
