= Pre-lucid dream =

Stage prior to lucid dreaming

Pre-lucid dreaming is the beginning stages of inducing the lucid dreaming process. At this stage, the dreamer considers the question: "Am I asleep and dreaming?" The dreamer may or may not come to the correct conclusion. Such experiences are liable to occur to people who are deliberately cultivating lucid dreams, but may also occur spontaneously to those with no prior intention to achieve lucidity in dreams.

== Terminology ==
The term lucid dreaming was coined by Dutch psychologist Frederik Willem Van Eeden who introduced the concept on the 22nd of April during a meeting held by the Society for Psychical Research in 1913. Still, this phenomenon has been present throughout historical periods, with some findings dating back to the writings of Aristotle. American psychophysiologist Stephen LaBerge introduced his method for physiological investigation of lucid dreaming through eye signals in the 1980s and ever since, more modern research has been established on the studies of the lucid dreaming process.

The term "pre-lucid dream" was first introduced by British parapsychologist Celia Green in her 1968 book Lucid Dreams. It is preferred to the term "near-lucid" dream on the following grounds:

- Historical priority: it has been in use since 1968.
- Currency: it was subsequently adopted by other writers on the phenomenon of lucid dreaming, such as Stephen LaBerge (1985).
- Clarity: lucidity in dreams may be thought of as a dichotomous variable: one either is or is not aware that one is dreaming at any given moment. Once lucidity is achieved it may have varying degrees of attainment, both from one person to another and from one dream to another within the same person. For example, one's memory of past events in one's waking life may be accessible and accurate to a greater or lesser degree. However, the bare fact of whether or not one is aware one is dreaming does not admit of gradations.

However, the term "pre-lucid dream" seems to imply that a lucid dream will follow, which is not necessarily true. At times, rather than considering the possibility that it may be a dream, the dreamer lights upon other explanations; some of the more common being that she has died and is in the next world, she's crazy, she's in another time dimension, she's on another planet, in outer space, she's been drugged or has a fever. The term "near-lucid" helps convey the often humorous "so close, yet so far away" aspect of such dreams.

== History and scientific research ==
Lucid dreaming has become subject of scientific investigations, and the researchers most meritorious for this achievement are Paul Tholey and Stephen LaBerge, two psychologists who devoted their lives to researching lucid dreams.

LaBerge developed a method known as "eye signals during lucid dreaming" which allowed him to physiologically investigate by comparing physiological processes with dream reports more precisely. With this method he would later go on to perform the first of many scientific research studies on lucid dreaming at Stanford University, which allowed for lucid dreaming and dreaming in general, to become an accessible and acceptable subject for research. Throughout the years, LaBerge's research would lead to the development of techniques that would serve as a recipe for inducing lucid dreaming, one of which was the ‘mnemonic induction of lucid dreams’ technique.

On the other hand, Tholey laid the epistemological basis for the research of lucid dreams. Tholey (1980, 1981) defined seven conditions of clarity that a dream must fulfill in order to be defined as a lucid dream. The author replaces the word Klarheit (clarity) with the word awareness, which is a well-known and central term in Gestalt therapy theory and describes the subjective experience of the conscious dream state:

1. Awareness of the dream state (orientation)
2. Awareness of the capacity to make decisions
3. Awareness of memory functions
4. Awareness of identity
5. Awareness of the dream environment
6. Awareness of the meaning of the dream
7. Awareness of concentration and focus (the subjective clarity of that state)

For a dream to be lucid as defined by Tholey, it must fulfill all seven factors; for LaBerge, lucid dreams stay true to the definition that they are dreams during which the dreamer recognizes the dream state and is able to act upon volition. The factors 3–7 are labeled as descriptions of a lucid dream.

LaBerge and other researchers in these studies would record and compare eye movements, heart rate, blood pressure and skin potential in lucid and non-lucid dreams, which concluded that lucid dreams occurred in those REM period sections that were characterized by increased physiological activation.

== Lucid dreaming incubation ==
An excerpt from LaBerge's novel, Exploring the World of Lucid Dreaming, suggests how these following steps could allow one to formulate the methods on how one would go about generating a lucid dream:

1. Introduce the intentions before going to bed and recite a single phrase or question by incorporating the matter you wish to dream about. Write down these intentions or draw an illustration that best depicts what you want to see and control in these dreams. ”When I dream of [the phrase], I will remember that I am dreaming.”
2. Head directly to bed after turning off all the lights and getting rid of all things that may become a distraction.
3. Recite your intentions one final time (whether it be a picture or a phrase) before falling asleep. Visualize yourself dreaming about the topic and becoming lucid in the dream. If there is something you want to try in the dream, also visualize doing those intentions once you become lucid. Meditate on the phrase/intention to become lucid in a dream about it until you fall asleep. Don't let any other thoughts come between thinking about your topic and falling asleep. If your thoughts stray, just return to thinking about your phrase and inducing lucidity.
4. If you achieve the ability to produce a lucid dream, pursue and carry out your intentions while in a lucid dream about your topic. Ask the question you wish to ask, seek ways to express yourself, try your new behavior, or explore your situation. Be sure to notice your feelings and be observant of all the details of the dream.
5. When you have achieved your goal, remember to awaken and recall the dream. When you obtain a satisfying answer in the dream, use one of the methods suggested earlier in this chapter to awaken yourself. Immediately write down at least the part of the dream that includes your solution. Even if you don't think the lucid dream has answered your question, once it begins to fade awaken yourself and write down the dream. You may find upon reflection that your answer was hidden in the dream and you did not see it at the time.”

== Varieties ==
Earl Vickers describes a number of aspects and variants of pre-lucid or near-lucid dreams:

- Misinterpreted dream signs: the dreamer notices incongruous thoughts, objects or events that suggest that this is a dream, but develops an alternate explanation.
- Failed dream tests: experiments such as pinching ourselves or trying to turn on a light only confirm the mistaken belief that we're definitely awake.
- Pseudo-lucid dreams: the dreamer believes that they are lucid without actually being lucid
- Dreams in which you try to convince someone else that they're dreaming.
- Non-lucid dreams about dreaming: discussing or theorizing about dreams, without being aware that we're dreaming
- False awakening dreams: the dreamer thinks he or she has woken up but is actually still dreaming.

== See also ==
- Inception
- Zhuangzi
