= Lucid dream =

Dream where one is aware that one is dreaming

In the psychology subfield of oneirology, a lucid dream is a type of dream wherein the dreamer knows that they are dreaming while in their dream. The capacity to have and sustain lucid dreams is a trainable cognitive skill. During a lucid dream, the dreamer may gain some amount of volitional control over the dream characters, narrative, or environment, although this control of dream content is not the defining feature of lucid dreaming. Lucid dreams can be objectively identified during sleep using predetermined eye-movement signals.

In formal psychology, lucid dreaming has been studied and reported for many years. Prominent figures from ancient to modern times have been fascinated by lucid dreams and have sought ways to better understand their causes and purpose. Many different theories have emerged as a result of scientific research on the subject. Research into the cognitive neuroscience of lucid dreaming has examined how brain activity relates to awareness during dreams. Studies suggest that brain regions associated with self-awareness, metacognition, and cognitive control may contribute to the experience of recognizing that one is dreaming. Further developments in psychological research have pointed to ways in which this form of dreaming may be utilized as a therapeutic technique.

The term lucid dream was coined by Dutch author and psychiatrist Frederik van Eeden in his 1913 article A Study of Dreams, though descriptions of dreamers being aware that they are dreaming predate the article. Psychologist Stephen LaBerge is widely considered the progenitor and leading pioneer of modern lucid dreaming research. He is the founder of the Lucidity Institute at Stanford University. LaBerge made important contributions to the scientific study of lucid dreaming by demonstrating that dreamers could communicate with researchers during REM sleep through predetermined eye movements. This provided an objective method for identifying lucid dreaming while participants remained asleep and helped establish lucid dreaming as a subject of experimental research.

== Definition ==
Paul Tholey laid the epistemological basis for the research of lucid dreams, proposing seven different conditions of clarity that a dream must fulfill to be defined as a lucid dream:

1. Awareness of the dream state (orientation)
2. Awareness of the capacity to make decisions
3. Awareness of memory functions
4. Awareness of self
5. Awareness of the dream environment
6. Awareness of the meaning of the dream
7. Awareness of concentration and focus (the subjective clarity of that state)

Later, in 1992, a study by Deirdre Barrett examined whether lucid dreams contained four "corollaries" of lucidity:

1. The dreamer is aware that they are dreaming
2. They are aware that actions will not carry over after waking
3. Physical laws need not apply in the dream
4. The dreamer has a clear memory of the waking world

Barrett found that less than a quarter of lucidity accounts exhibited all four.

Subsequently, Stephen LaBerge studied the prevalence among lucid dreams of the ability to control the dream scenario, and found that while dream control and dream awareness are correlated, neither requires the other. LaBerge found dreams that exhibit one clearly without the capacity for the other. He also found dreams where, although the dreamer is lucid and aware they could exercise control, they choose simply to observe.

An important distinction is that lucid dreaming is a distinct type of dream from other types of dreams such as prelucid dreams and vivid dreams, although prelucid dreams are a precursor to lucid dreams, and lucid dreams are often accompanied with enhanced dream vividness. Lucid dreams are also a distinct state from other lucid boundary sleep states such as lucid hypnagogia or lucid hypnopompia.

== History ==
=== Eastern ===
The practice of lucid dreaming is central to both the ancient Indian Hindu practice known today as, yoga nidra, and the Tibetan Buddhist practice of dream yoga. The cultivation of such awareness was a common practice among early Buddhists.

=== Western ===
Early references to the phenomenon are also found in ancient Greek writing. For example, the philosopher Aristotle wrote: "often when one is asleep, there is something in consciousness which declares that what then presents itself is but a dream." Meanwhile, the physician Galen of Pergamon used lucid dreams as a form of therapy. In addition, a letter written by Saint Augustine of Hippo in AD 415 tells the story of a dreamer, Doctor Gennadius, and refers to lucid dreaming.

Philosopher and physician Sir Thomas Browne (1605–1682) was fascinated by dreams and described his own ability to lucid dream in his Religio Medici, stating: "...yet in one dream I can compose a whole Comedy, behold the action, apprehend the jests and laugh my self awake at the conceits thereof."

Samuel Pepys, in his diary entry for 15 August 1665, records a dream, stating: "I had my Lady Castlemayne in my arms and was admitted to use all the dalliance I desired with her, and then dreamt that this could not be awake, but that it was only a dream."

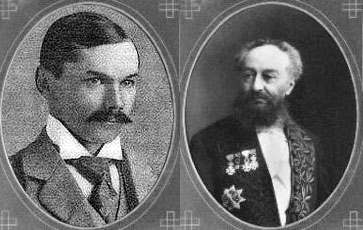
Frederik van Eeden (left) and Marquis d'Hervey de Saint Denys (right), early researchers of lucid dreaming

In 1867, the French sinologist Marie-Jean-Léon, Marquis d'Hervey de Saint Denys anonymously published Les Rêves et Les Moyens de Les Diriger; Observations Pratiques ("Dreams and the ways to direct them; practical observations"), in which he describes his own experiences of lucid dreaming, and proposes that it is possible for anyone to learn to dream consciously.

In 1913, Dutch psychiatrist and writer Frederik (Willem) van Eeden (1860–1932) coined the term "lucid dream" in an article entitled "A Study of Dreams".

Some have suggested that the term is a misnomer because Van Eeden was referring to a phenomenon more specific than a lucid dream. Van Eeden intended the term lucid to denote "having insight", as in the phrase a lucid interval applied to someone in temporary remission from a psychosis, rather than as a reference to the perceptual quality of the experience, which may or may not be clear and vivid.

== Skill mastery ==
Clinical psychologist Kristen LaMarca outlined four stages towards mastering the skill of using lucid dreaming:

Lucid Dreaming Skill Levels
| Stage | Title | Description | Rarity |
|---|---|---|---|
| 1 | Beginner | The practitioner is generally unacquainted with lucid dream experience, but is perhaps familiarized with pre-lucid dreaming. | Common |
| 2 | Experienced | An experienced lucid dreaming practitioner wields an increased ability of dream control and capacity to execute pre-intended actions. However, there are still aspects of lucid dream practice about employing lucidity productively that are yet to be honed. One's understanding of accessing and maintaining dream lucidity deepens as one has more lucid dreams. | Less common |
| 3 | Proficient | A proficient lucid dreamer is marked by a deliberate ability to accomplish intended actions in lucid dreams, along with knowledge of the best actions for given dream scenarios. The proficient lucid dream practitioner's practice is well-planned, drawing upon a broad skill set facilitating flexible oneironautic exploration, which can include contemplative practices or athletic motor skill training. This level of skill adequacy is not necessary to develop a fulfilling lucid dream practice. | Uncommon |
| 4 | Expert | Expertise in lucid dream skill is accompanied by normalization of greater intensity of lucidity during lucid dreams. LaMarca writes that the expert's practice is "characterized by at least a decade of intense dedication, long training hours, and mentorship by other more advanced experts." Spiritual figures, such as Tibetan Buddhist masters, tend to display the highest order of mastery. | Extremely rare |

Progression along the skill levels is akin to a maturity in the development of the practitioner's discipline, methodology and application.

== Cognitive science ==
In 1968, Celia Green analyzed the main characteristics of such dreams, reviewing previously published literature on the subject and incorporating new data from participants of her own. She concluded that lucid dreams were a category of experience quite distinct from ordinary dreams and said they were associated with rapid eye movement sleep (REM sleep). Green was also the first to link lucid dreams to the phenomenon of false awakenings, which has since been corroborated by more recent studies.

In 1973, the National Institute of Mental Health reported that researchers at the University of California, San Francisco, were able to train sleeping subjects to recognize they were in REM dreaming and indicate this by pressing micro switches on their thumbs. Using tones and mild shocks as cues, the experiments showed that the subjects were able to signal knowledge of their various sleep stages, including dreaming.

In 1975, Dr. Keith Hearne had the idea to exploit the nature of rapid eye movements (REM) to allow a dreamer to send a message directly from dreams to the waking world. Working with an experienced lucid dreamer (Alan Worsley), he eventually succeeded in recording (via the use of an electrooculogram or EOG) a pre-defined set of eye movements signaled from within Worsley's lucid dream. This occurred at around 8 am on the morning of April 12, 1975. Hearne's EOG experiment was formally recognized through publication in the journal for The Society for Psychical Research. Lucid dreaming was subsequently researched by asking dreamers to perform pre-determined physical responses while experiencing a dream, including eye movement signals.

In 1980, Stephen LaBerge at Stanford University developed such techniques as part of his doctoral dissertation. In 1985, LaBerge performed a pilot study that showed that time perception while counting during a lucid dream is about the same as during waking life. Lucid dreamers counted out ten seconds while dreaming, signaling the start and the end of the count with a pre-arranged eye signal measured with electrooculogram recording. LaBerge's results were confirmed by German researchers D. Erlacher and M. Schredl in 2004. However, these findings also demonstrate that motor activities, like performing squats, require more time in lucid dreams than in wakefulness.

In a further study by Stephen LaBerge, four subjects were compared, either singing or counting while dreaming. LaBerge found that the right hemisphere was more active during singing and the left hemisphere was more active during counting.

Neuroscientist J. Allan Hobson has hypothesized what might be occurring in the brain while lucid. The first step to lucid dreaming is recognizing that one is dreaming. This recognition might occur in the dorsolateral prefrontal cortex, which is one of the few areas deactivated during REM sleep and where working memory occurs. Once this area is activated and the recognition of dreaming occurs, the dreamer must be cautious to let the dream continue, but be conscious enough to remember that it is a dream. While maintaining this balance, the amygdala and parahippocampal cortex might be less intensely activated. To continue the intensity of the dream hallucinations, it is expected the pons and the parieto-occipital junction stay active.

Using electroencephalography (EEG) and other polysomnographical measurements, LaBerge and others have shown that lucid dreams begin in the rapid eye movement (REM) stage of sleep. LaBerge also proposes that there are higher amounts of beta-1 frequency band (13–19 Hz) brain wave activity experienced by lucid dreamers, hence there is an increased amount of activity in the parietal lobes making lucid dreaming a conscious process.

Paul Tholey, a German Gestalt psychologist and a professor of psychology and sports science, originally studied dreams in order to resolve the question of whether one dreams in colour or black and white. In his phenomenological research, he outlined an epistemological frame using critical realism. Tholey instructed his subjects to continuously suspect waking life to be a dream, in order that such a habit would manifest itself during dreams. He called this technique for inducing lucid dreams the Reflexionstechnik (reflection technique). Subjects learned to have such lucid dreams; they observed their dream content and reported it soon after awakening. Tholey could examine the cognitive abilities of dream figures. Nine trained lucid dreamers were directed to set other dream figures arithmetic and verbal tasks during lucid dreaming. Dream figures who agreed to perform the tasks proved more successful in verbal than in arithmetic tasks. Tholey discussed his scientific results with Stephen LaBerge, who has a similar approach.

A study was conducted by Stephen LaBerge and other scientists to see if it were possible to attain the ability to lucid dream through a drug. In 2018, galantamine was given to 121 patients in a double-blind, placebo-controlled trial, the only one of its kind. Some participants found as much as a 42 percent increase in their ability to lucid dream, compared to self-reports from the past six months, and ten people experienced a lucid dream for the first time. It is theorized that galantamine allows acetylcholine to build up, leading to greater recollection and awareness during dreaming.

=== Two-way communication ===
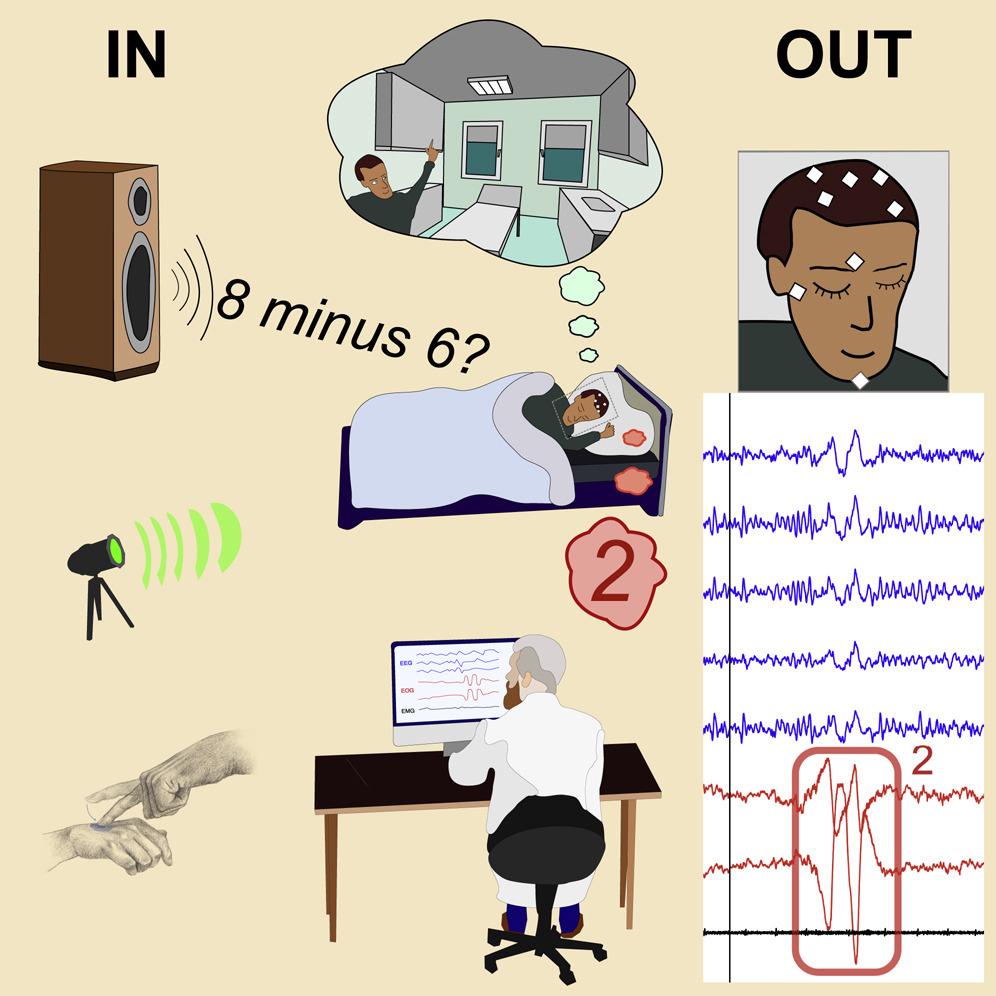
Graphical abstract of "Real-time dialogue between experimenters and dreamers during REM sleep"

Teams of cognitive scientists have established real-time two-way communication with people undergoing a lucid dream. During dreaming, they were able to consciously communicate with experimenters via eye movements or facial/speech muscle signals and comprehend complex questions and use working memory. Such interactive lucid dreaming could be a new approach for the scientific exploration of the dream state and could have applications for learning and creativity.

=== Alternative theories ===
Other researchers suggest that lucid dreaming is not a state of sleep, but of brief wakefulness, or "micro-awakening". Experiments by Stephen LaBerge used "perception of the outside world" as a criterion for wakefulness while studying lucid dreamers, and their sleep state was corroborated with physiological measurements. LaBerge's subjects experienced their lucid dream while in a state of REM, which critics felt may mean that the subjects are fully awake. J. Allen Hobson responded that lucid dreaming must be a state of both waking and dreaming.

Philosopher Norman Malcolm was a proponent of dream skepticism. He has argued against the possibility of checking the accuracy of dream reports, pointing out that "the only criterion of the truth of a statement that someone has had a certain dream is, essentially, his saying so." Yet dream reports are not the only evidence that some inner drama is being played out during REM sleep. Electromyography on speech and body muscles has demonstrated the sleeping body covertly walking, gesturing and talking while in REM, such activity generally correlating with dream reports.

== Prevalence and frequency ==
In 2016, a meta-analytic study by David Saunders and colleagues on 34 lucid dreaming studies, taken from a period of 50 years, demonstrated that 55% of a pooled sample of 24,282 people claimed to have experienced lucid dreams at least once or more in their lifetime. Furthermore, for those that stated they did experience lucid dreams, approximately 23% reported to experience them on a regular basis, as often as once a month or more. In a 2004 study on lucid dream frequency and personality, a moderate correlation between nightmare frequency and frequency of lucid dreaming was demonstrated. Some lucid dreamers also reported that nightmares are a trigger for dream lucidity. Previous studies have reported that lucid dreaming is more common among adolescents than adults.

A 2015 study by Julian Mutz and Amir-Homayoun Javadi showed that people who had practiced meditation for a long time tended to have more lucid dreams. The authors claimed that "Lucid dreaming is a hybrid state of consciousness with features of both waking and dreaming" in a review they published in Neuroscience of Consciousness in 2017.

Mutz and Javadi found that during lucid dreaming, there is an increase in activity of the dorsolateral prefrontal cortex, the bilateral frontopolar prefrontal cortex, the precuneus, the inferior parietal lobules, and the supramarginal gyrus. All are brain functions related to higher cognitive functions, including working memory, planning, and self-consciousness. The researchers also found that during a lucid dream, "levels of self-determination" were similar to those that people experienced during states of wakefulness. They also found that lucid dreamers can only control limited aspects of their dream at once.

Mutz and Javadi also have stated that by studying lucid dreaming further, scientists could learn more about various types of consciousness, which happen to be less easy to separate and research at other times.

== Techniques ==
A 2022 meta-analysis of studies on lucid dream induction techniques identified 14 techniques and classified them as cognitive techniques, external stimuli, substance intervention, and cortical stimulation.

There is no one technique that works consistently for everyone. Most people create a variation of an already known technique, and use it for themselves.

The article by Stumbrys et al. (2012) investigates techniques to induce lucid dreams and answers the question if they are effective and reliable. Therefore, a systematic review of all relevant studies on the topic of lucid dreaming was conducted. The authors searched for academic databases as well as specialized resources. In total, 35 studies on the topic of lucid dreaming were identified, 11 of them were conducted in a sleep-laboratory, whereas the other 24 were field studies on the use of different cognitive techniques as well as on the effect of different types of external stimulation. To answer the question posed by the research question, the authors provided an overview of the studies, and they distinguished between methods that were supported by scientific evidence and methods that had not been proven yet. According to the authors, an important limitation of the studies on lucid dreaming is the low methodological quality of most of the studies. Moreover, some of the studies included in the review had very small samples of participants, which makes a comparison of the results of the single studies difficult. This article is very useful for a Wikipedia article on the topic, because it provides an overview of all studies on the topic and clearly distinguishes between results that are supported by scientific evidence and results that have not been proven yet.

In a 2020 study, psychologist Denholm J. Aspy examined the effectiveness of different lucid dream induction techniques. The study included 355 participants who completed the full study and found that the Mnemonic Induction of Lucid Dreams (MILD) and Senses Initiated Lucid Dream (SSILD) techniques, when practiced with the Wake Back to Bed (WBTB) method, had similar effectiveness. Combining MILD and SSILD did not produce better results than using either technique individually. The study also found that participants reported lucid dreams more frequently on nights when they fell asleep within 10 minutes of completing an induction technique.

== Suggested applications ==
=== Treating nightmares ===
It has been suggested that those who suffer from nightmares could benefit from the ability to be aware they are indeed dreaming. A pilot study performed in 2006 showed that lucid dreaming therapy treatment was successful in reducing nightmare frequency. This treatment consisted of exposure to the idea, mastery of the technique, and lucidity exercises. It was not clear what aspects of the treatment were responsible for the success of overcoming nightmares, though the treatment as a whole was said to be successful.

Australian psychologist Milan Colic has explored the application of principles from narrative therapy to clients' lucid dreams, to reduce the impact not only of nightmares during sleep but also depression, self-mutilation, and other problems in waking life. Colic found that therapeutic conversations could reduce the distressing content of dreams, while understandings about life—and even characters—from lucid dreams could be applied to their lives with marked therapeutic benefits.

Psychotherapists have applied lucid dreaming as a part of therapy. Studies have shown that, by inducing a lucid dream, recurrent nightmares can be alleviated. It is unclear whether this alleviation is due to lucidity or the ability to alter the dream itself. A 2006 study performed by Victor Spoormaker and Van den Bout evaluated the validity of lucid dreaming treatment (LDT) in chronic nightmare sufferers. LDT is composed of exposure, mastery and lucidity exercises. Results of lucid dreaming treatment revealed that the nightmare frequency of the treatment groups had decreased. In another study, Spoormaker, Van den Bout, and Meijer (2003) investigated lucid dreaming treatment for nightmares by testing eight subjects who received a one-hour individual session, which consisted of lucid dreaming exercises. The results of the study revealed that the nightmare frequency had decreased and the sleep quality had slightly increased.

Holzinger, Klösch, and Saletu managed a psychotherapy study under the working name of "Cognition during dreaming—a therapeutic intervention in nightmares", which included 40 subjects, men and women, 18–50 years old, whose life quality was significantly altered by nightmares. The test subjects were administered Gestalt group therapy, and 24 of them were also taught to enter the state of lucid dreaming by Holzinger. This was purposefully taught in order to change the course of their nightmares. The subjects then reported the diminishment of their nightmare prevalence from two to three times a week to two to three times per month.

=== Creativity ===
In her book The Committee of Sleep, Deirdre Barrett describes how some experienced lucid dreamers have learned to remember specific practical goals such as artists looking for inspiration seeking a show of their own work once they become lucid or computer programmers looking for a screen with their desired code. However, most of these dreamers had many experiences of failing to recall waking objectives before gaining this level of control.

Exploring the World of Lucid Dreaming by Stephen LaBerge and Howard Rheingold (1990) discusses creativity within dreams and lucid dreams, including testimonials from a number of people who claim they have used the practice of lucid dreaming to help them solve a number of creative issues, from an aspiring parent thinking of potential baby names to a surgeon practicing surgical techniques. The authors discuss how creativity in dreams could stem from "conscious access to the contents of our unconscious minds"; access to "tacit knowledge"—the things we know but can't explain, or things we know but are unaware that we know.

The Dreams Behind the Music book by Craig Webb (2016) details lucid dreams of a number of musical artists, including how they are able not just to hear, but also compose, mix, arrange, practice, and perform music while conscious within their dreams.

== Risks ==
Though lucid dreaming can be beneficial to a number of aspects of life, some risks have been suggested. Those struggling with certain mental illnesses could find it hard to tell the difference between reality and the lucid dream (psychosis).

A very small percentage of people may experience sleep paralysis, which can sometimes be confused with lucid dreaming. Although from the outside, both seem to be quite similar, there are a few distinct differences that can help differentiate them. A person usually experiences sleep paralysis when they partially wake up in REM atonia, a state in which said person is partially paralyzed and cannot move their limbs. When in sleep paralysis, people may also experience hallucinations. Although said hallucinations cannot cause physical damage, they may still be frightening. There are three common types of hallucinations: an intruder in the same room, a crushing feeling on one's chest or back, and a feeling of flying or levitating. About 7.6% of the general population have experienced sleep paralysis at least once. Exiting sleep paralysis to a waking state can be achieved by intently focusing on a part of the body, such as a finger, and wiggling it, then continuing the action of moving to the hand, the arm, and so on, until the person is fully awake.

Long-term risks with lucid dreaming have not been extensively studied, although many people have reported lucid dreaming for many years without any adverse effects. In 2018, researchers at the Wisconsin Institute for Sleep and Consciousness conducted a study that concluded individuals who lucid dream more frequently have a more active and well-connected prefrontal cortex.

== See also ==
- Active imagination
- Embodied imagination
- Astral projection
- Patricia Garfield
- Pre-lucid dream
- Recurring dream
- Sleep paralysis
- Yoga nidra
- Carl Jung
- Sigmund Freud
- Dream
- Dreamwork
- Dream character
- Dreams in analytical psychology
- Dreaming (journal)
- Oneirology
- Oneiromancy
- Oneironautics
- Unconscious mind
- International Association for the Study of Dreams (IASD)
- Dream incubation
- Fever dream
