= Marie-Jean-Léon, Marquis d'Hervey de Saint Denys =

French sinologist (1822–1892)

The Marquis d'Hervey de Saint-Denys
- Marie-Jean-Léon Lecoq
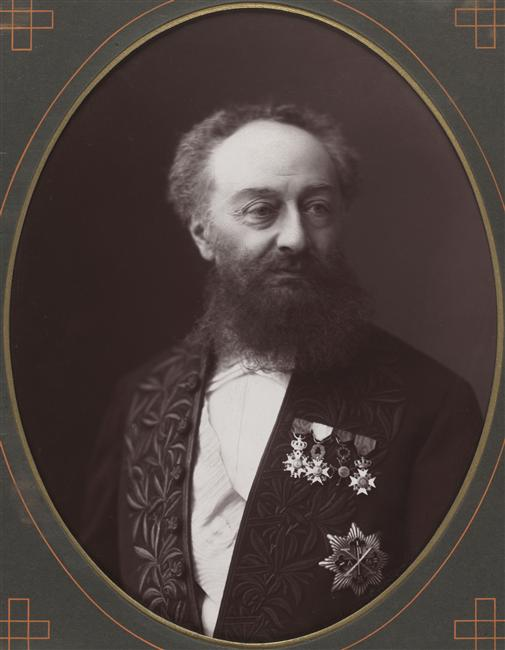
- Born: 6 May 1822; Paris, France
- Died: 2 November 1892 (aged 70); Paris, France
- Scientific career
- Workplaces: Collège de France
- Academic advisors: Stanislas Julien
- Notable students: Édouard Chavannes

Marie-Jean-Léon Lecoq, Baron d'Hervey de Juchereau, Marquis d'Hervey de Saint-Denys (6 May 1822 – 2 November 1892) was a French sinologist, known for his contributions to the study of Chinese language, literature, history, and ethnography. He is also known for his seminal research on dreams, via his 1867 book Les rêves et les moyens de les diriger; observations pratiques (Dreams and the Ways to Direct Them: Practical Observations), published anonymously.

Hervey de Saint-Denys's book on dreams influenced Freud and Proust. His translations of Chinese poetry influenced Mahler.

== Early life and education ==
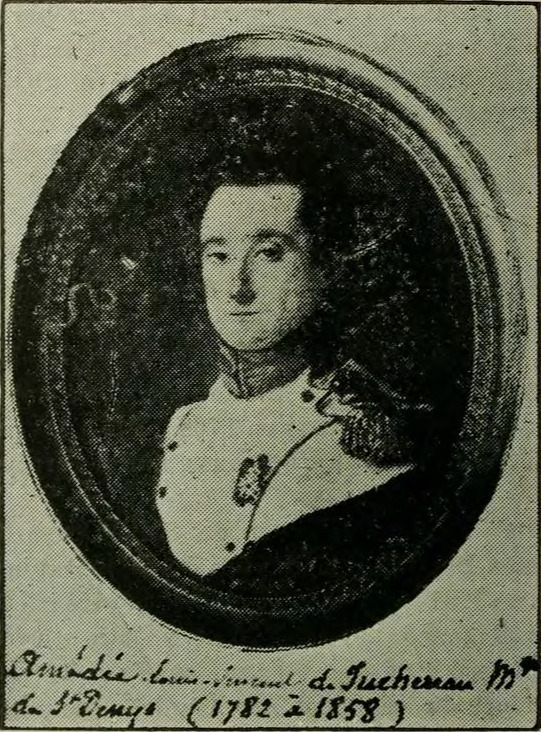
Amédée Louis-Vincent Juchereau, marquis de Saint-Denys

Hervey de Saint Denys was born 6 May 1822. He was the son of Pierre Marin Alexandre Le Coq or Lecoq, Baron d'Hervey (1780–1858), and Marie Louise Josephine Mélanie Juchereau de Saint-Denys (1789–1844).

He was adopted in 1858 by his maternal uncle Amédée Louis Vincent Juchereau, marquis de Saint-Denys (1782–1858), who was without descendants, so that he would inherit the title of Marquis of Saint-Denys.

In 1844, d'Hervey received a law degree (licence en droit).

In 1848, he graduated from the Ecole des langues orientales vivantes, which was later renamed the Institut national des langues et civilisations orientales (INALCO).

== Contributions to China studies ==
Hervey de Saint Denys made an intense study of the Chinese language, and published works on ethnography and on the history and literature of China. In 1851 he published Recherches sur l'agriculture et l'horticulture des Chinois (Research on the agriculture and horticulture of the Chinese), which detailed Chinese plants and animals that might be potentially acclimatized to and introduced in Western countries.

In 1862 he published a watershed book of translations of Chinese poetry, Poetry of the Tang Dynasty. The book also contains a lengthy preface, L'art poétique et la prosodie chez les Chinois, about Chinese poetry and prose, which sets out the various sinological theories on the differences between written and spoken Chinese, the monosyllabic nature of Chinese, and the ideographic nature of Chinese. A selection of his translated poems from this volume, along with selections from Judith Gautier's volume of loosely translated Chinese poems Livre de Jade (1867), were the fundamental basis for Gustav Mahler's song cycle for voice and orchestra, Das Lied von der Erde.

He also translated Chinese texts such as some Chinese stories, which were not strictly of classical interest but valuable for the light they throw on Chinese culture and customs.

From 1864 to 1872, Hervey de Saint-Denys was president of the Société d'ethnographie.

Hervey de Saint Denys was also a noted collector of Chinese porcelain, and other Chinese art objects such as jade and lacquer works. At the 1867 Paris Exhibition, he was commissioner for the Chinese exhibits, and on 30 June 1867 he was made a Chevalier of the Legion of Honour.

From 1868 to 1870 he was professor of Chinese language at the Institut national des langues et civilisations orientales (INALCO), then still known as Ecole des langues orientales vivantes.

Following the death of Stanislas Julien (1797–1873), in 1874 Hervey de Saint Denys succeeded him as the chairman of Chinese at the Collège de France, and served until his death in 1892.

In 1878 he was elected a member of the Académie des Inscriptions et Belles-Lettres, and remained a member until his death in 1892. In 1888, he was president of the Académie.

Hervey de Saint Denys translated some Spanish-language works as well, and wrote a history of the Spanish drama.

Hervey de Saint Denys also created a literary translation theory, which was paraphrased by Joshua A. Fogel, the author of a book review on De l'un au multiple: Traductions du chinois vers les langues européenes, as "empowering the translator to use his own creative talents to embellish wherever necessary—not a completely free hand, but some leeway to avoid the pitfall of becoming too leaden."

== Contributions to dream studies ==
By the late 1980s Hervey de Saint Denys was rediscovered internationally for his introspective studies on dreams. He was one of the earliest oneirologists (specialists in the study of dreams), and is now regarded as the father of modern lucid dreaming.

In 1867 an anonymous book was published titled Les rêves et les moyens de les diriger; observations pratiques (Dreams and the Ways to Direct Them: Practical Observations); in a footnote on page 1 from the 1878 edition of Alfred Maury's work Le sommeil et les rêves Hervey de Saint Denys was identified as its author. Writers including Havelock Ellis (1911), Johann Stärcke (1912), and A. Breton (1955) referred to the fact that the original anonymous publication was hard to obtain as copies were scarce, because shortly after publication its publisher Amyot went bankrupt. Sigmund Freud, in The Interpretation of Dreams (1899), stated: "Maury, Sleep and Dreams, Paris, 1878, p. 19, argues strenuously against d'Hervey, whose book I could not lay hands on in spite of all my efforts." Nevertheless, Freud mentioned Hervey de Saint Denys's book three times in that work.

Hervey de Saint Denys started recording his dreams on a daily basis from the age of 13. In Les Rêves et les Moyens de Les Diriger, he proposed a theoretical framework, techniques to control dreams, and described dreams in which the "dreamer is perfectly aware he is dreaming". Recently the question has been raised as to who coined the term "lucid dreaming"; generally it is attributed to Frederik van Eeden, but some scientists question if this was inspired by the use of the term by Saint-Denys. Denys describes his own lucid dreams in statements such as "I was aware of my situation."

In a 1988 article from Den Blanken & Meijer, the authors decried the fact that there was so little biographical data available on such an erudite person as Saint-Denys, and by 1991 they presented some.

In 1964 Éditions Tchou reprinted Les Rêves Et Les Moyens de Les Diriger, but the 1867 Appendix, entitled 'Un rêve apres avoir pris du hatchich' (A dream after taking hashish) was omitted without mention, due to its content. In 1982 an abbreviated English edition appeared which was based on the Tchou edition, and did not contain or refer to the Appendix. In 1991 Den Blanken and Meijer's revised article on Hervey de Saint Denys revealed the omission, and presented for the first time an English translation of the Appendix. Others were inspired by Den Blanken and Meijer's research. In 1992 the French dream research group Oniros held a commemoration of Saint-Denys in Paris; leading dream specialists Carolus den Blanken, Celia Green, Paul Tholey (1937–1998) and Oniros president-elect Roger Ripert paid their respects and offered homages.

In 1995 Oniros published a complete French version of Denys' book on dreams. In the 21st century, Italian, Dutch, and Japanese translations have appeared. In 2016 a complete English version (including the original frontpage, back cover, and frontispiece) appeared as a free ebook with the title Dreams and the Ways to Direct Them: Practical Observations, edited by Carolus den Blanken and Eli Meijer. In this translation, the designer of the front cover of the 1867 original is revealed as French painter and draughtsman Henri Alfred Darjou (1832–1875). This edition was not without flaws, and in 2020 an enhanced version appeared.

== Personal life ==
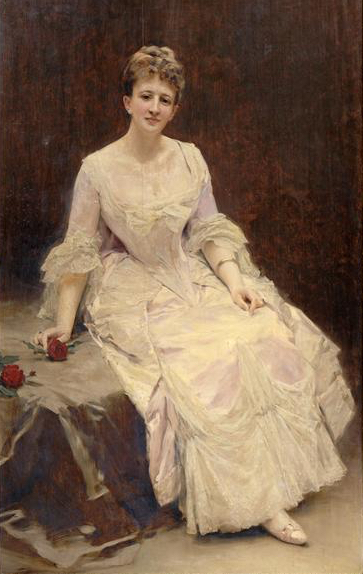
D'Hervey's wife Louise Ward (Madrazo y Garreta, 1885)

In 1868, at the age of 46, Hervey de Saint-Denys married Louise Ward, sometimes rendered Louise de Ward (1849–1930), an 18-year-old Austrian baroness who was the daughter of Baron Thomas Ward. The couple lived in Paris in their mansion at 9 Avenue Bosquet.

Louise became an accomplished and successful painter, studying with Pierre Auguste Cot. She signed her paintings "Louise Dubreau", sometimes rendered "Louise Dubréau", after Hervey's estate Château du Bréau near Dourdan in Seine-et-Oise in the department of Yvelines.

Hervey de Saint-Denys's book on dreams influenced Marcel Proust's thoughts about dreams and about memories. He may have influenced Proust's interest in chinoiserie as well, and he is mentioned in Proust's multi-volume novel series In Search of Lost Time as the donor of an antique Chinese vase.

Hervey de Saint Denys died in his mansion in Paris on 2 November 1892.

== Bibliography ==
=== China studies ===
- Hervey de Saint-Denys (1850). Recherches sur l'agriculture et l'horticulture des Chinois et sur les végétaux, les animaux et les procédés agricoles que l'on pourrait introduire... dans l'Europe occidentale et le nord de l'Afrique. (Studies on the agriculture and horticulture of the Chinese). Allouard et Kaeppelin. Paris. text online
- Hervey de Saint-Denys (1859). La Chine devant l'Europe. Amyot/Paris. text online
- Hervey de Saint-Denys (1862). Poésies de l'époque des T'ang. Étude sur l'art poétique en Chine (Poems of the Tang dynasty). Paris: Amyot.
- Hervey de Saint-Denys (1869). Recueil de textes faciles et gradués en chinois moderne, avec un tableau des 214 clefs chinoises et un vocabulaire de tous les mots compris dans les exercices, publié à l'usage des élèves de l'École spéciale des langues orientales.
- Hervey de Saint-Denys (1870). Le Li-sao, poéme du IIIe siècle avant notre ére, traduit du chinois (The Li Sao, a poem of the 3rd century BC, translated from Chinese). Paris: Maisonneuve.
- Hervey de Saint-Denys (1872). Mémoire sur l'histoire ancienne du Japon d'après le Ouen Hien Tong Kao de Ma-Touan-Lin. Imprimerie Nationale. Paris. Text online
- Hervey de Saint-Denys (1873). Mémoire sur l'ethnographie de la Chine centrale et méridionale, d'après un ensemble de documents inédits tirés des anciens écrivains chinois. In-8°, paginé 109–134. Extrait des "Mémoires de la Société d'ethnographie". XII. text online
- Hervey de Saint-Denys (1873–1880). Ban Zai Sau, pour servir à la connaissance de l'Extrême-Orient, 4 vol.
- Hervey de Saint-Denys (1875). Sur le pays connu des anciens Chinois sous le nom de Fou-sang, et de quelques documents inédits pouvant servir à l'identifier. Comptes rendus des séances de l'Académie des Inscriptions et Belles-Lettres, Vol. 19, Issue 4, pages 319–335. Text online
- Hervey de Saint-Denys (1876). Mémoire sur le pays connu sous le nom de Fou-Sang.
- Hervey de Saint-Denys (1876–1883). Ethnographie des peuples étrangers de la Chine (Ethnography of people abroad in China), translated from Ma Duanlin.H. Georg, 2 Vol.4. Paris. - London H. Georg. - E. Leroux. - Trübner. text online
- Hervey de Saint-Denys (1879). Sur une notice de M. August Strindberg concernant les relations de la Suède avec la Chine et les pays tartares, depuis le milieu du XVIIe siècle jusqu'à nos jours. Comptes rendus des séances de l'Académie des Inscriptions et Belles-Lettres, Vol 23, Issue 2, pages 137–140.
- Hervey de Saint-Denys (1885). Trois nouvelles chinoises. Translation of selections from Jingu qiguan 今古奇觀.Ernest Leroux éditeur, « Bibliothèque Orientale Elzévirienne », vol. XLV, Paris. Text online
- Hervey de Saint-Denys (1886). L'Annam et la Cochinchine. Imprimerie Nationale. Paris.
- Hervey de Saint-Denys (1887). Mémoires sur les doctrines religieuses; de Confucius et de l'école des lettres (Dissertations on religious doctrines; from Confucius to the school of letters).
- Hervey de Saint-Denys (1889). La tunique de perles. Une serviteur méritant et Tant le Kiaï-Youen, trois nouvelles chinoises. E. Dentu, Paris. Reprint in Six nouvelles chinoises, Éditions Bleu de Chine, Paris, 1999.
- Hervey de Saint-Denys (1892). Six nouvelles nouvelles, traduites pour la première fois du chinois par le Marquis d'Hervey-Saint-Denys. Éditions J. Maisonneuve, Collection Les Littératures Populaires, t. XXX, Paris. Reprint in Six nouvelles chinoises, Éditions Bleu de Chine, Paris, 1999.
- Hervey de Saint-Denys (2004). Écoutez là-bas, sous les rayons de la lune, traduzione di Li Bai e note del marchese d'Hervey Saint-Denis, Redaction Céline Pillon.

=== Dream studies ===
- Hervey de Saint-Denys (1867). Les Rêves et les moyens de les diriger; Observations pratiques. (Transl.: Dream and the Ways to Direct Them: Practical Observations). Paris: Librairie d'Amyot, Éditeur, 8, Rue de la Paix.(Originally published anonymously). Text online

Reprints and translations

- Hervey de Saint-Denys (1964). Les Rêves et les moyens de les diriger. Paris: Tchou/Bibliothèque du Merveilleux.Preface by Robert Desoille. Edited by Jacques Donnars. This edition does not contain 'The Appendix' from the 1867 book. Text online
- Hervey de Saint-Denys (1977). Les Rêves et les moyens de les diriger. Plan de la Tour: Editions d'Aujourd'hui.(Facsimile reprint of the Tchou-Edition).
- Hervey de Saint-Denys (1982). Dreams and how to guide them. Translated by N.Fry and edited by Morton Schatzman. London. Gerald Duckworth. ISBN 0-7156-1584-X. (abbreviated version)
- Hervey de Saint-Denys (1991). Les Reves et les Moyens de les Diriger. Editor D'Aujourd'hui. ISBN 9782915842135. No illustrations.
- Hervey de Saint-Denys (1995). Les Reves et Les Moyens de Les Diriger:Observations Pratiques. ISBN 978-2-909318-03-5. Soc.Oniros/Paris.
- Hervey de Saint-Denys (2000). I sogni e il modo di dirigerli. (Transl.: The dream and the way to direct it). Translation by C.M. Carbone, Il Minotauro, Phoenix. ISBN 9788886732246.
- Hervey de Saint-Denys (2013). Dromen: Praktische Observaties. (Transl.: Dreams: Practical Observations - Integral Dutch Translation of Les Rêves et les moyens de les diriger: Observations Pratiques)(E-book) ISBN 978-90-82096309. Editor and Translator Drs. Carolus M. den Blanken.
- Hervey de Saint-Denys (2007). Les Rêves et les moyens de les diriger. No illustrations. ISBN 978-2-915842-23-4 Broché. Editions Cartouche/Paris. Also in E-book format.
- Hervey de Saint-Denys, Marie Jean Leon (2008). Les Reves et les Moyens de les diriger. No illustrations. No Appendix. ISBN 9782915495515. Paperback, Buenos Books International/Paris.
- Hervey de Saint-Denys, Marie Jean Leon (2012). Yume no sojuho. ISBN 9784336054944. Editor Takashi Tachiki. Publ. Kokushokankokai/Tokyo;2012.
- Hervey de Saint-Denys, Marie Jean Leon (2013). Les Reves et les Moyens de les diriger. No illustrations. No Appendix. E-Pub Edition, Buenos Books America LLC. ISBN 9782915495522.
- Hervey de Saint-Denys (2016). Dreams and the Ways to Direct Them: Practical Observations. Published by Carolus den Blanken/Utrecht (E-book) ISBN 978-90-820963-6-1. Editors: Drs. Carolus den Blanken and Drs. Eli Meijer. English Translator: Drs. Carolus den Blanken. Translator Greek & Latin Sentences: Prof. Dr. Jan van Gijn. Integral Edition.
- Hervey de Saint-Denys (2020). Dreams and the Ways to Direct Them: Practical Observations, Including an appendix with a record of a dream after taking hashish. Inner Garden Press/Utrecht (E-book) ISBN 978-94-6163-041-4. Editor: Derekh Moreh. (Enhanced edition of the Den Blanken translation)
- Hervey de Saint-Denys (2021). Dreams and how to direct them: Practical Observations. Ouroboros Publishing (paperback) ISBN 978-1-989586-47-1. Editor: Ouroboros Publishing. Translator: D. Bernardo.
- Hervey de Saint-Denys (2021). Los sueños y como dirigirlos: Observaciones prácticas. Published by Abraxas Editores. Editor: Abraxas Editores. Translator: D. Bernardo.

==== Commentary on Hervey de Saint-Denys's dream studies ====
- Henri Cordier (1892). Necrologie: Le Marquis d'Hervey Saint Denys . T'oung Pao- International Journal of Chinese Studies. Vol. 3 No. 5, pag. 517–520. Publisher E.J. Brill/Leiden/The Netherlands. Text online
- Alexandre Bertrand (1892). Annonce du décès de M. le marquis Léon d'Hervey de Saint-Denys, membre de l'Académie.(Transl.: Announcement of the death of Marquis d'Hervey de Saint-Denys, member of the Academie). Comptes rendus des séances de l'Académie des Inscriptions et Belles-Lettres, Vol. 36, Issue 6, page 377. Text online
- Alexandre Bertrand (1892). Paroles prononcées par le Président de l'Académie à l'occasion de la mort de M. le marquis d'Hervey-Saint-Denys. (Transl.: Words spoken by the president of the academy on the occasion of the death of marquis d'Hervey de Saint-Denys). Comptes rendus des séances de l'Académie des Inscriptions et Belles-Lettres, Vol. 36, Issue 6, pages 392–397. Text online
- B. Schwartz (1972). Hervey de Saint-Denys: Sa vie, ses recherches et ses découvertes sur le sommeil et les reves. Hommage à l'occasion du 150e anniversaire de sa naissance (Transl.: Hervey de Saint-Denys: His life, his investigations and his discoveries about the sleep and the dreams. Tribute on the 150th anniversary of his birth). Revue d'Electroencéphalographie et de Neurophysiologie Clinique, Vol 2, Issue 2, April–June 1972, pages 131–139.
- C.M. den Blanken & E.J.G. Meijer (1988/1991). An Historical View of "Dreams and the Ways to Direct Them; Practical Observations" by Marie-Jean-Léon LeCoq, le Marquis d'Hervey-Saint-Denys. Lucidity Letter, December, 1988, Vol.7, No.2, p. 67-78. Revised Edition:Lucidity,1991, Vol.10 No.1&2, p. 311-322. This article contains an English translation of the forgotten Appendix from the 1867 book.
- B. Schwartz (1992). Ce qu'on a du savoir, cru savoir, pu savoir sur la vie du marquis d'Hervey de Saint-Denys.(Transl.: What was supposed to be known and what was believed to be known). Oniros no. 37/38, pag. 4–8. Soc. Oniros/Paris.
- R. Ripert (1992). Découverte et réhabilitation d'Hervey de Saint-Denys.(Transl.: The discovery and rehabilitation of d'Hervey de Saint-Denys). Oniros no.37/38 pag. 20–21. Soc. Oniros/Paris.
- O. de Luppé, A. Pino, R. Ripert & B. Schwartz (1995). D'Hervey de Saint-Denys 1822-1892; Biographie, Correspondance familiale, l'oeuvre de l'onirologue & du sinologue; les hommages rendus à l'auteur lors du centenaire de sa mort et l'exposition artistique autour de ses rêves. (Transl.: D'Hervey de Saint-Denys 1822-1892; Biography, Family correspondence, oneirological and sinological works; Tributes to the author on the centenary of his death and artistic exposition regarding his dreams) Oniros, BP 30, 93451 Ile Saint-Denis cedex. The tributes are by Carolus den Blanken, Celia Green, Roger Ripert and Paul Tholey. ISBN 978-2909318035
- Jacqueline Carroy (2013). La force et la couleur des rêves selon Hervey de Saint-Denys. Rives Méditerranéennes, 44, p. 53-68. Référence électronique (2013). Rives Méditerranéennes 44. Text online
