= Thomas Ward, Baron Ward =

English jockey, court favourite and minister (1810–1858)

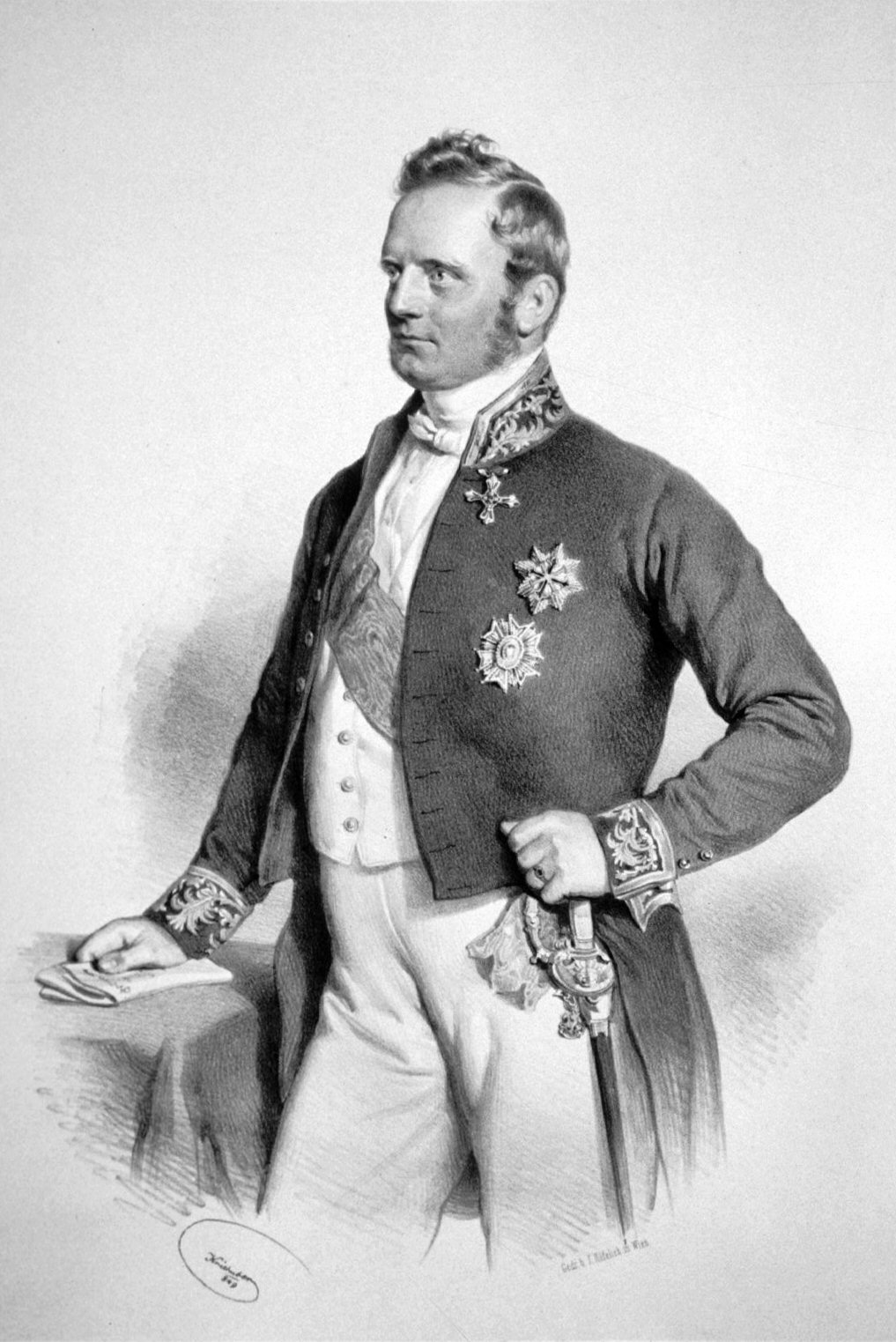
Thomas Ward, 1849 lithograph

Thomas Ward, Baron Ward of the Austrian Empire (1810–1858) was an English jockey and court favourite, who became finance minister in the Duchy of Lucca.

== Early life ==
He was born at Howden, Yorkshire, the son of William Ward and his wife Margaret Marvil. He left school at age 9 and went to work in the stables of Robert Ridsdale.

== Career ==
Ward subsequently went to Vienna and by about 1823 was a jockey for the Prince of Liechtenstein.

In 1833, he moved to the Duchy of Lucca. With a personal recommendation, Ward became adviser to Charles Louis of Bourbon, then Duke of Lucca. In 1843 he brokered an arrangement with Archduke Ferdinand Karl Joseph of Austria-Este that traded the political independence of the Duchy for financial support to the indebted Duke.

In 1846 Ward was promoted to master of the horse and to be minister of the household and finance, with the title of Baron. In these administrative positions Ward showed ability, but a lack of scruple: he was said to have sought popularity by arbitrarily lowering the price of grain, and the partial default on the debt of Lucca was also attributed to his advice. In 1847, on the death of Marie Louise, Duchess of Parma, Charles Louis succeeded to the Duchy of Parma, as arranged at the Congress of Vienna, and at the same time ceded Lucca to Tuscany. Ward was sent to Florence to superintend the details of the transfer.

At Parma, Ward remained chief minister to the duke, and continued to work in the interests of the Austrian government. He was sent as ambassador-extraordinary to Spain in 1848 to negotiate the resumption of diplomatic relations, and was created a knight grand cross of the Order of Charles III. In the same year, on the accession of Franz Joseph I of Austria, he was deputed to congratulate him, and received the Order of the Iron Crown of Austria. On 20 May 1849 he brought about the abdication of his old patron, replaced by his son Charles III, Duke of Parma. He was now sent as minister-plenipotentiary to represent the duchy at Vienna, and the Emperor conferred on him the Austrian title of Baron.

Subsequently, Ward, who was fluent in French, German, and Italian, went on a diplomatic mission to London, and impressed Lord Palmerston. On 21 July 1853, he received a patent of concession of all the mining rights over iron and copper in the duchy.

His old master's widow Maria Teresa of Savoy headed a group at the Parmesan court suspicious of Ward and the Austrian connection. In 1854, Duke Charles III was assassinated, and Ward was dismissed from all his posts. Ward then claimed the protection of Austria, and spent the rest of his life farming the estate he had been given at Urschendorf near Vienna. He died on 5 October 1858.

== Personal life ==
In 1832 Ward married Louise Genthner, a commoner from a Viennese family; they had two sons and two daughters.

His daughter Louise Ward married French sinologist and dream researcher Léon, Marquis d'Hervey de Saint Denys (1822–1892) in 1868, and had a successful career as a painter under the pseudonym Louise Dubreau. After Hervey de Saint Denys's death she married French Olympic equestrian Jacques de Waru (1865–1911) in 1896.
