= Dream character =

Character in a person's dream

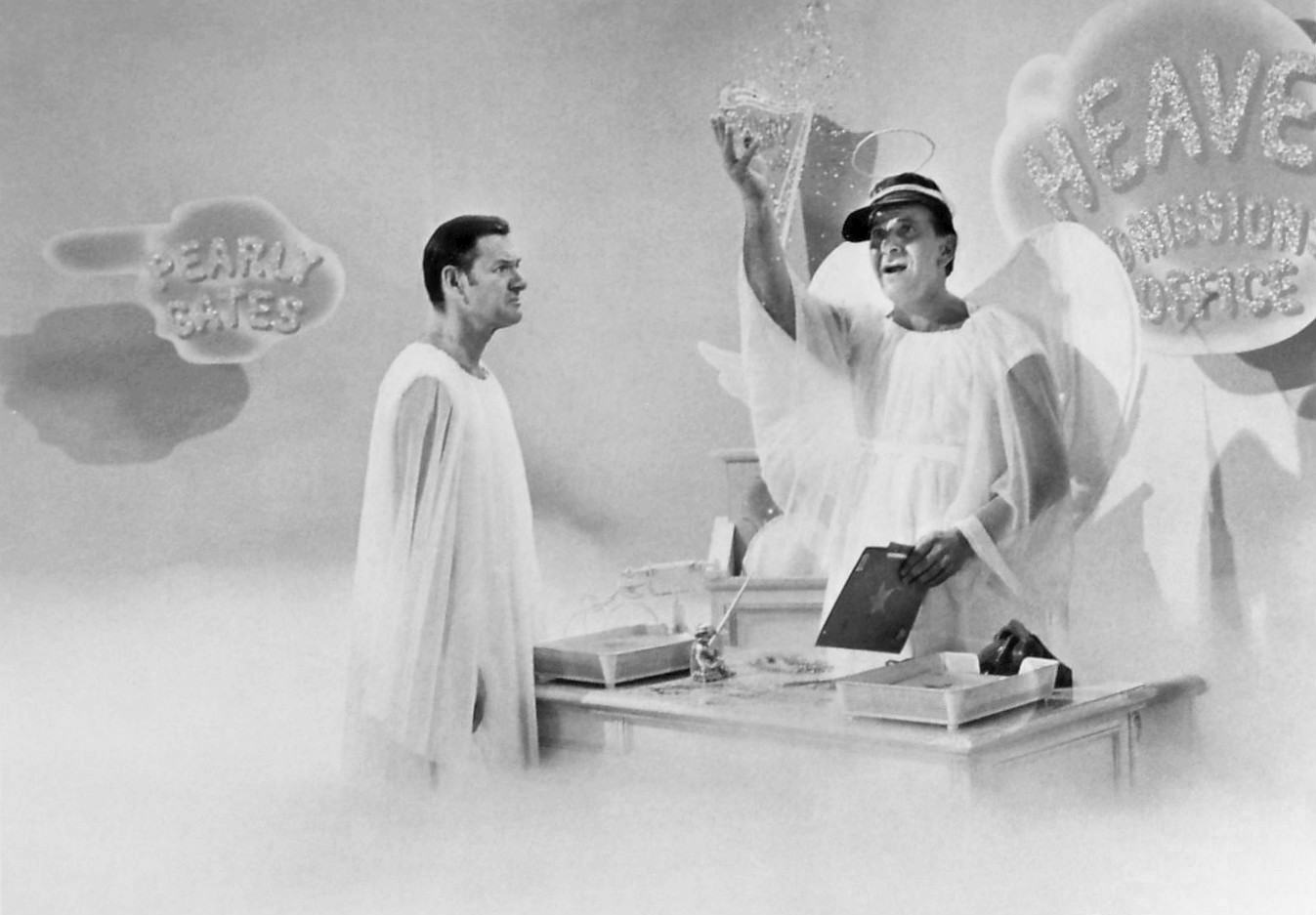
A scene from The Odd Couple television series where a person encounters a dream character in heaven

A dream character is an interactable human-like entity in a person's dream, especially while the person is REM-sleeping. The topic has been profoundly addressed in the lucid dreaming community, since while experiencing a lucid dream, the person can consciously interact with dream characters.

A specific dream character may reappear from dream to dream.

== Capabilities ==
Dream characters may agree or disagree if asked to perform specific tasks. If they agree, they can solve tasks such as rhyming or drawing, although they have relatively poor arithmetical skills.

Furthermore, dream characters have the ability to come up with ways to outwit the dreamer, like switching off the light to avoid his or her gaze. Recurring dream characters can learn from previous dreams and adapt their behaviour accordingly.

== Nature ==
The nature of dream characters is subject to debate amongst dream researchers. Some psychotherapists suggest that they represent parts of the dreamer's self.

The hypothesis that dream characters may have a consciousness of their own has been brought forth by some researchers, such as Paul Tholey. Although this hypothesis is impossible to prove, experiments have shown them to have capabilities which suggest that they may have independent points of view and behave like conscious beings.
