= De l'un au multiple =

Essays about translations of Chinese into European languages

De l'un au multiple: Traductions du chinois vers les langues européennes Translations from Chinese into European Languages ("From one into many: Translations from the Chinese to the European languages") is an academic book in French and English with essays about translations of Chinese into European languages. It was published in 1999 by the Éditions de la MSH, Fondation Maison des sciences de l'homme, and edited by Viviane Alleton and Michael Lackner. The introduction states that the purpose of this work is to examine specific issues in translation from Chinese to European languages and from the Chinese culture to Western cultures, instead of promoting a new theory regarding translation.

== Contents ==
The introduction, bilingual in French and English, is written by editors Viviane Alleton and Michael Lackner. It is titled "De la traduction du chinois dans les langues européennes" in French, and "Introduction. On translating from the Chinese into European languages" in English. Paul W. Kroll, author of a book review for the Journal of the American Oriental Society, wrote that the grammar of the English version of the introduction is "less than perfect".

The work contains eight essays in English and seven essays in French, with the essays organized into five sections. Each article in French has an abstract in English and each article in English has an abstract in French. The essay authors include academics and researchers. Of the authors of the essays, 9 were from France, 4 were from Germany, and one each were from Italy, Norway, Taiwan, and the United States. Of all of the authors, only one, Andrew H. Plaks, is a native speaker of English.

Kroll wrote that every one of the essays featured in the work has "numerous useful nuggets on particular words and phrases" and that "several" essays "include extensive bibliographies that take account of many little-known works from years and centuries past." Joshua A. Fogel, an author of a book review of this book for The Journal of Asian Studies, wrote that of the writers, none of them "believes in one-to-one correspondence between source and target texts".

=== Essays by chapter ===
==== The European game ====
The first section, "The European game" ("Le jeu européen des langues"), contains the essays "The Role of Intermediate Languages in Translations from Chinese into German" by Wolfgang Bauer and "Italian Translations of Chinese Literature" by Federico Masini.

Bauer's essay, which has the French title "Le rôle des langues intermédiaires dans les traductions du chinois en allemand", refers to the practice of translating content first into English or French, the "intermediate language", before the text is re-translated into German. In French this kind of re-translation is referred to as "la belle infidèle". Bauer wrote that re-translators, in the words of Fogel, "were not tied to the specifics of the original and thus often produced works of enduring beauty in German" while many direct translators "often had great difficulties making their texts sing in French or German". T. H. Barrett, author of a review of this book for the Bulletin of the School of Oriental and African Studies, wrote that "English is naturally prominent among" the re-translations. In his essay Bauer wrote that by 2000 English became an "internationalese" that made intermediate language translations obsolete, and that therefore there had been little attention paid to the intermediate languages. Bauer referred to how there were far more Chinese translators that were based out of North America compared to a small number some Chinese intellectuals who translate into non-English languages. Barrett wrote that this essay was "masterful". Fogel also wrote that the authors of the pieces of the book are no longer "willing to settle for belle infidèles, although, as the term implies, one can recognize their merits."

Masini's essay, titled in French as "Les traductions italiennes de littérature chinoise", explores translations of Chinese works into Italian.

==== The personalities of translators ====
The second section, "The personalities of translators" ("Des traducteurs d'envergure"), contains "Literary Translations of the Classical Lyric and Drama of China in the First Half of the 20th Century: The 'Case' of Vincenz Hundhausen (1878-1955)" by Lutz Bieg, "Richard Wilhelm, a 'Sinicized' German Translator" by Michael Lackner, "Slow Poison or Magic Carpet: The Du Fu Translations by Erwin Ritter von Zach" by Monika Motsch, "Le marquis d'Hervey-Saint-Denys et les traductions littéraires: À propos d'un texte traduit par lui et retraduit par d'autres" by Angel Pino and Isabelle Rabut.

Bieg's essay, which has the French title "Traductions de théâtre et de poésie chinoise classique dans la première moitié du xx^{e} siècle", is about Vincenz Hundhausen, a German translator of Chinese drama, poetry, and prose. Bieg believes that Hundhausen's works are, in the words of Fogel, "among the best produced in his Generation." Lackner's essay, with the French title "Richard Wilhelm, un traducteur allemand « sinisé » ?", discusses Richard Wilhelm. Motsch's essay, titled in French as "Poison lent ou tapis volant. Les traductions de Du Fu par Erwin Ritter von Zach", explores Erwin Ritter von Zach's translations of poetry written by Du Fu. Pino and Rabut's essay, which has the English title "The marquis D’Hervey-Saint-Denys and literary translations", is about Marie-Jean-Léon, Marquis d'Hervey de Saint Denys. Fogel wrote that Pino and Rabut "offer an extremely detailed analysis of D'Hervey as translator, looking closely at the principles of translation and how he applied them."

==== The translator speaks ====
The third section, "The translator speaks" ("Le traducteur parle"), discusses translators contemporary to the time of the book's publication. This section contains "Traduction terminable et interminable" by Jacques Dars and "La passion de traduire" by André Lévy. Both authors were recognized translators in Europe.

Dars' essay, titled "Terminable and interminable translation" in English, discusses the process of attempting to make a translation definitive. He compares it to psychoanalysis. Lévy's essay, which has the English title "The passion for translation", discusses the motivations of translators.

==== The versatilities of translations ====
The fourth section, "The versatilities of translations" ("Les aléas des textes"), contains essays discussing issues in particular translations. The section includes "On Mengxi bitan's World of Marginalities and 'South-pointing Needles': Fragment Translation vs. Contextual Tradition" by Daiwie Fu, "Si c'était à refaire...ou: de la difficulté de traduire ce que Confucius n'a pas dit" by Anne Cheng, and "Authorital Presence in Some Pre-Buddhist Chinese Texts" by Christophe Harbsmeier.

Daiwie Fu's essay, titled "A propos de monde de la marginalité dans le Mengxi Bitan et des « aiguilles pointant vers le sud »" in French, states, as paraphrased by Yu Xiuying (Chinese: 于秀英; pinyin: Yú Xiùyīng), a professor of the French language at Nanjing University and an author of a book review for Babel, that European translators such as Joseph Needham have inevitable degradation of their texts because they use "taxonomic conception in their choice of fragments to render and their manner of doing it". The essay uses Dream Pool Essays (Mengxi bitan) as a case study. Fogel wrote that Daiwie Fu's essay shows the importance of translating "contextually to see how the original authors conceived of their own entire system of thought" instead of translating "fragments of works with the aim of some putative universal scheme". The Daiwie Fu essay criticizes Joseph Needham. The Anne Cheng essay, titled "If it were to be redone... or: on the difficulty of translating what Confucius did not say" in English, discusses a phrase from Analects (Lunyu), "The subjects of which the Master seldom spoke were-profitableness, and also the appointments of Heaven, and perfect virtue" (traditional Chinese: 子罕言利與命與仁; simplified Chinese: 子罕言利与命与仁). She analyzes the way thirty translations of Analects translate that sentence. The essay does not have information on the Brooks translation, which was more recent. Barrett wrote that Cheng's essay was "authoritative" and that it "shows a fine appreciation of 'un pragmatisme tout brittanique' in the work of Raymond Dawson". The Harbsmeier essay, titled "Présence d’un auteur dans quelques textes chinois pré-bouddhiques" in French, discusses pre-Qin dynasty texts' usage of the grammatical first person, and therefore their authorial presence. Barrett wrote that Harbsmeier's essay "appends some valuable additions to Michael Loewe's 1993 bibliographical guide".

==== Words and polysemy ====
The fifth section, "Words and polysemy" ("Rémunérer la deefaillance des mots"), discusses polysemy and issues in translating from Chinese that appear in four genres. It includes "Problèmes d'indéterminations sémantiques dans la traduction de textes philosophiques" by Jean Levi, "Noms de plantes asiatiques dans les langues européennes. Essai en forme de vade-mecum" by Georges Métailié, "Traduire ou transcrire les noms de personnages : incidences sur la lecture" by Yinde Zhang (張寅德; 张寅德; Zhāng Yíndé), and "The mean, nature and self-realization. European translations of the Zhongyong" by Andrew Plaks.

Jean Levi's essay, titled "Problems of semantic indetermination in the translation of philosophical texts" in English, discusses the "semantic plasticity" that is a core component of philosophical texts from Ancient China and how "semantic plasticity" complicates translation. He argues that, as paraphrased by Fogel, "as long as the translation does not attempt perfection, it will succeed if it conveys a feel for the original." The Métailié essay, which has the English title "Translations of Asian plant names into European languages", discusses issues with translating plant names from the Chinese and Japanese languages into European languages. Yinde Zhang's essay, titled "Translating or transcribing the names of literary characters?" in English, discusses the transcribing and translating names of characters within modern Chinese fiction, and the essay compares the different efforts to accomplish the tasks. The Plaks essay, titled in French as "Le milieu, la nature et la réalisation de soi Traductions européennes du Zhongyong", argues that since the text of the Doctrine of the Mean (Zhongyong) is "too easy", this factor is, as paraphrased by Fogel, a "major impediment" to translation.

== Reception ==
Barrett concluded that "every British student interested in the Chinese humanities should be familiar with the contents of this book."

Kroll wrote that in this book "most of the authors are more concerned with discussing matters of historical fact, context, and development than demonstrating their own translation skills" so therefore the emphasis of the book is skewed "more toward information than opinion" and that the articles "are of more than usual interest and value".

Fogel concluded that "On the whole, these essays offer a refreshing look in the theoretical, as well as practical, as seen through the eyes of real translators."

Yu Xiuying wrote that the work was of high quality as a reference book or a "simply pleasant book" ("un livre simplement plaisant") and that the book would be a considerable service ("service considérable") to specialized translators.
