= André Lévy (sinologist) =

French sinologist

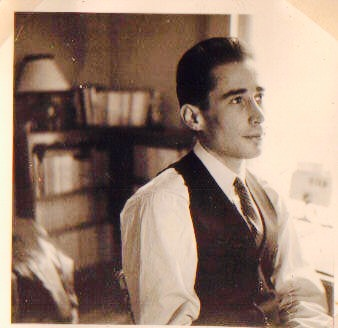
- Born: 24 November 1925; Tianjin, China
- Died: 3 October 2017 (aged 91); Bordeaux, France
- Occupation: Sinologist
- Known for: translated many Chinese works of fiction into French

André Lévy (French pronunciation: [ɑ̃dʁe levi]; 24 November 1925 – 3 October 2017) was a French sinologist.

He was born in 1925 in Tianjin. He translated many Chinese works of fiction into French.

== Biography ==
Levy was born in Tianjin, China, in 1925, the son of a family of watchmakers and jewellers, and grew up in the French concession in Tianjin. He married Anne-Marie Lévy, the Norwegian writer. Levy studied French and Sinology, Hindi and Sanskrit at the Sorbonne, and published numerous translations from the Chinese, including La pérégrination vers l'Ouest (Xiyou ji - Journey to the West) and Fleur en fiole d'or (Jin Ping Mei). In 1958, he was in charge of the EFEO in Hanoi for a while, before its closure. In 1959 he went to Kyoto, where he availed himself of the rich collections of Chinese literature at the Japon Jimbun Kagaku Kenkyûsho library. He left Kyoto in 1966, and went to Hong Kong, still as an EFEO researcher. In 1974 he received his doctorate in stories and spoken language of the seventeenth century. In 1969 he was appointed Director of Chinese Studies at the University of Bordeaux. Between 1981 and 1984 he was Director of the East Asian department at Paris-VII University. In 1995 he became Emeritus Professor at l'université Bordeaux-III. He received the bronze medal of the CNRS, and was made Commandeur des Palmes académiques in 1988.

== Publications ==
- Lévy, André. "Fleur sur l'océan des péchés". (book review of A Flower in a Sinful Sea, Archive). Études chinoises, No. 1, 1982.
- * Fleur en fiole d'or, Jin Ping Mei Cihua. Translated and annotated by André Lévy. La Pléiade Gallimard 1985. Folio Gallimard 2004. 2 volumes ISBN 2-07-031490-1. The first translation into a Western language to use the 1610 edition.
- Lévy, André. "La passion de traduire." (Archive) In: Alleton, Vivianne and Michael Lackner (editors). De l'un au multiple: traductions du chinois vers les langues européennes Translations from Chinese into European Languages. Éditions de la maison des sciences de l'homme (Les Editions de la MSH, FR), 1999, Paris. p. 161-172. ISBN 273510768X, 9782735107681. - English abstract available

== Honours and awards ==
- Commandeur of the Ordre des Arts et des Lettres (1992)
- Commandeur of the Ordre des Palmes Académiques (1998)

== Obituaries ==
Lévy died in Bordeaux with death published in the Le Monde, 4 October 2017

== Bibliography ==
- Fogel, Joshua A. De l'un au multiple: Traductions du chinois vers les langues européenes (book review). The Journal of Asian Studies, ISSN 0021-9118, 02/2001, Volume 60, Issue 1, pp. 159 – 161. Available from JStor. - Review of De l'un au multiple: Traductions du chinois vers les langues européenes
