= Microarousal =

Brief interruptions of sleep

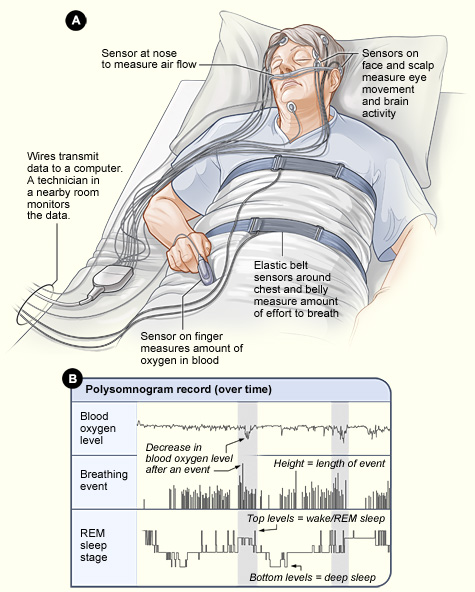
EEG recordings can reveal brief microarousals that do not fully awaken the sleeper.

Microarousal, also known as micro-awakening, refers to brief, often sub-second interruptions of sleep characterized by partial cortical activation without full consciousness. These transient arousals can occur during any sleep stage and are typically detectable through electroencephalography (EEG) as short bursts of brain activity. Micro-arousals play an important role in sleep fragmentation and are associated with sleep disorders, such as obstructive sleep apnea, as well as with cognitive performance and daytime alertness. Although sleep interruptions are often regarded as detrimental, some research suggests that brief awakenings may play a role in normal sleep physiology.

Micro-awakenings are very short periods when the brain becomes partially awake between sleep cycles. During these moments, adults often adjust their position or move slightly before returning to sleep, often without any conscious awareness. Microarousals, which typically last between three and fifteen seconds, are commonly associated with a variety of sleep disorders. However, studies in rodents have found that microarousals during non-rapid eye movement sleep (NREM sleep) are associated with memory consolidation and the clearance of metabolic waste from the brain. Researchers have therefore proposed that these brief arousals may contribute to the restorative and adaptive functions of sleep.

== Overview ==
A microarousal is a brief episode of increased brain activity during sleep that is usually insufficient to fully awaken an individual. Microarousals can be triggered by sensory disturbances, including fluctuations in blood pressure or heart rate, as well as environmental noise. When occurring excessively, microarousals can fragment sleep, producing effects similar to sleep deprivation or restriction, such as emotional dysregulation, cognitive impairment, and social withdrawal. Frequent microarousals are also a common feature of certain neurological disorders, including depression, and of respiratory conditions such as obstructive sleep apnoea (OSA). In infants and young children, sleep cycles are shorter and include a higher proportion of light sleep. As a result, micro-awakenings occur more frequently, and children may have difficulty falling back asleep on their own, often waking and crying during the night.

Microarousals occur frequently during NREM sleep and have been linked to fluctuations in the neurotransmitter noradrenaline. Studies in mice have shown that neurons in the locus coeruleus release pulses of noradrenaline at regular intervals during NREM sleep, often coinciding with microarousals. These findings have challenged the traditional view that noradrenaline is primarily associated with wakefulness and suggest that noradrenergic activity may also have an important role during sleep. The proposed role of microarousals in facilitating waste clearance has implications for understanding the glymphatic system, a network through which cerebrospinal fluid helps remove metabolites and other substances from the brain. While some studies have reported increased glymphatic activity during sleep, other research has produced conflicting results, and the precise relationship between sleep, microarousals, and glymphatic clearance remains an active area of investigation.

== Research findings ==
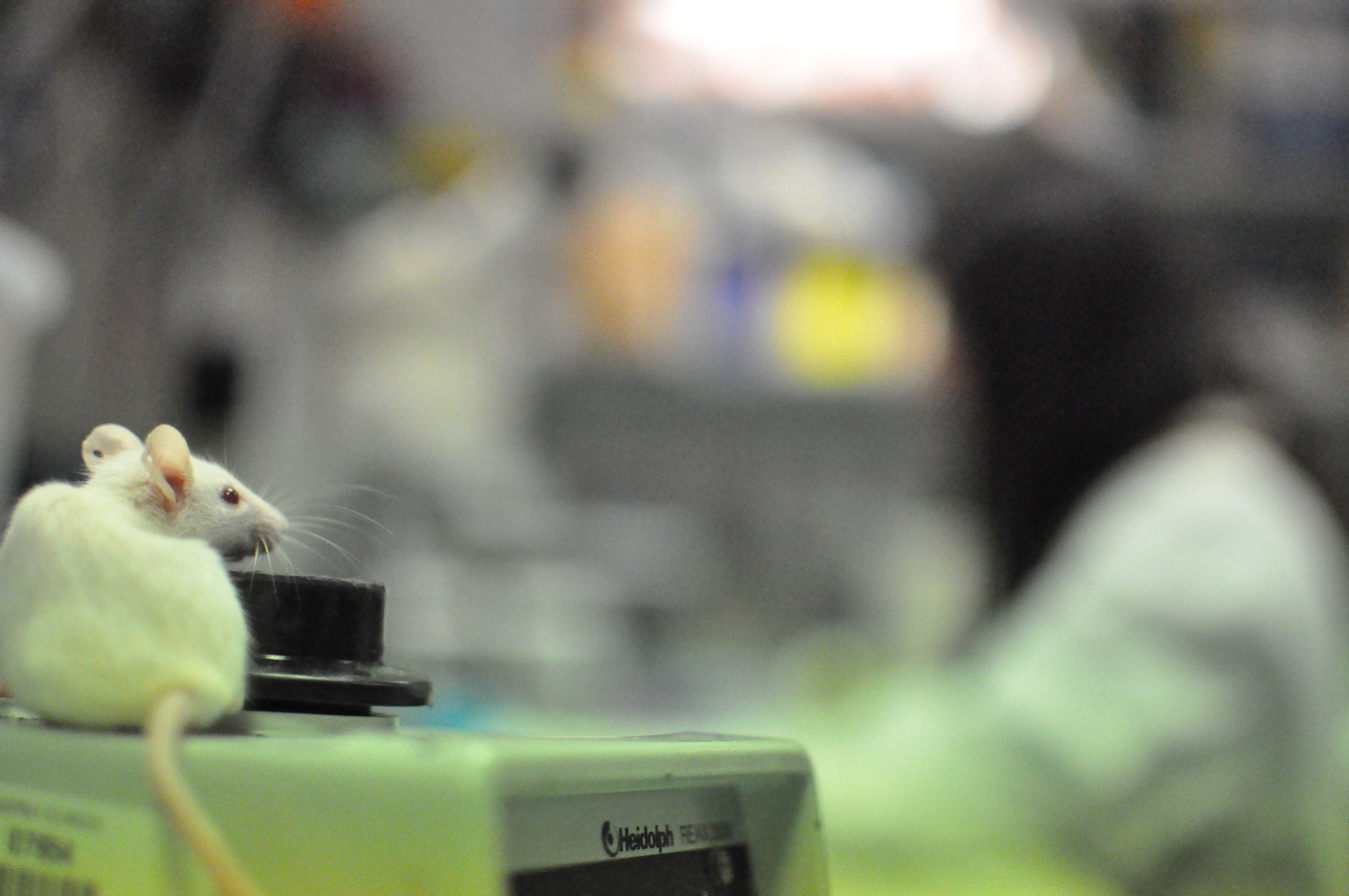
Laboratory mice are commonly used in research on microarousals and sleep physiology.

In a 2024 Chinese study, the average sleep efficiency was about 98%. Participants experienced roughly 47 microarousals lasting at least 3 seconds per night. Of these, about 26 lasted at least 5 seconds, 19 lasted at least 7 seconds, and 13 lasted at least 9 seconds on average. The minimum duration required to define a microarousal has been a topic of ongoing discussion. Although a 3-second minimum duration was established by the American Sleep Disorders Association in 1992, this criterion has been criticized for low inter-scorer reliability. Some researchers have suggested that longer durations may more accurately characterize microarousals and provide greater clinical utility in assessing cognitive impairment in patients with obstructive sleep apnoea (OSA). Long microarousals lasting 15 to 60 seconds correlated more strongly with subjective sleepiness than short microarousals of 3 to 15 seconds in individuals with OSA. In healthy adults undergoing mild sleep restriction, a higher number of EEG-detected microarousals during sleep was significantly associated with lower levels of positive mood during the day. It was also linked to poorer performance on tasks measuring selective attention, particularly in disengagement and orientation. However, these associations varied depending on the duration threshold used to define microarousals, the time of testing, and the specific type of task performed.

Research has suggested that fluctuations in noradrenaline released by the locus coeruleus during non-rapid eye movement sleep (NREM sleep) may influence the movement of fluids within the brain. A 2025 study reported that rhythmic pulses of noradrenaline were associated with contractions and expansions of cerebral blood vessels in sleeping mice, producing oscillations in blood and cerebrospinal fluid volumes that coincided with increased glymphatic clearance. The authors proposed that noradrenergic activity, rather than microarousals themselves, may play a central role in coordinating these processes. The findings have been interpreted as evidence for a link between noradrenergic signalling, sleep physiology, and glymphatic function. However, the extent to which these observations apply to humans remains uncertain. Researchers have noted similarities between the findings and previously observed large-scale fluctuations in blood flow and cerebrospinal-fluid movement during human NREM sleep, but further investigation is required.

Microarousals have also been proposed to contribute to memory consolidation during sleep. Some researchers argue that surges of noradrenaline during sleep are closely linked to microarousals, while others caution that not all noradrenergic fluctuations should be interpreted as arousal events. Studies in rodents have suggested that the locus coeruleus can generate both arousals accompanied by awakening and subtler arousal states that do not result in conscious awakening. According to this view, microarousals form part of the normal dynamics of sleep rather than representing purely disruptive events. A number of researchers have proposed that healthy sleep requires a balance between noradrenergic activity and microarousals. Both unusually low and unusually high rates of microarousal have been hypothesised to interfere with the restorative functions of NREM sleep, although the precise mechanisms involved remain an active area of research.

== Biological function ==
Microarousals (MAs) occur across mammalian species and have been identified as components of healthy sleep. However, they are observed most frequently in sleep disorders correlated with physical uneasiness or mental health conditions. The diagnostic relevance of MA frequency for adverse health outcomes has contributed to a predominant view of MAs as disruptive to sleep. This perspective has led to comparatively less attention on MAs in sleep physiology research, which has historically emphasized mechanisms that encourage sleep and inhibit arousal. Although the neurobiological origins of MAs are not fully understood, recent rodent studies indicate that several wake-promoting brain regions remain active during sleep, generating MAs at specific times under particular brain-body states. These findings suggest that MAs may have a part in normal sleep dynamics, complementing the clinical perspective that primarily associates them with sleep disruption. To date, research on microarousals in rodents has primarily addressed a specific scientific question, providing insights that complement the clinical perspective that sleep fragmentation can reduce the restorative benefits of sleep.

Continuous sleep supports the restoration of the brain and body, while fragmented sleep has negative effects on cognition and overall health. Microarousals (MAs), brief intrusions into sleep typically lasting 3 to 15 seconds, serve as clinical indicators of various sleep disorders. Recent studies in rodents indicate that MAs occurring in the course of healthy non-rapid eye movement (NREM) sleep are determined by infraslow fluctuations in noradrenaline (NA), which are coordinated with electrophysiological rhythms, vasomotor movement, blood volume in the brain, and glymphatic flow. These findings suggest that MAs are an integral part of normal sleep dynamics, highlighting potential biological functions.

Evidence indicates that MAs may support the benefits of NREM sleep associated with NA fluctuations, following an inverted U-shaped relationship. Reduced noradrenergic fluctuations, as can occur in neurodegenerative conditions or with certain sleep aids, are associated with fewer MAs, while heightened fluctuations, such as those caused by stress, can fragment NREM sleep and disrupt NA signaling. MAs are therefore considered important for the recuperative and pliability-fostering functions of sleep and provide insight into both ordinary and pathological arousal dynamics.

== See also ==
- Microsleep
