= Microsleep =

Temporary episode of sleep or drowsiness

Example of an EEG alpha wave

Example of an EEG theta wave

A microsleep is a sudden temporary episode of sleep or drowsiness which may last for a few seconds where an individual fails to respond to some arbitrary sensory input and becomes unconscious. Episodes of microsleep occur when an individual loses and regains awareness after a brief lapse in consciousness, often without warning, or when there are sudden shifts between states of wakefulness and sleep. In behavioural terms, microsleeps may manifest as droopy eyes, slow eyelid-closure, and head nodding. In electrical terms, microsleeps are often classified as a shift in electroencephalography (EEG) during which 4–7 Hz (theta wave) activity replaces the waking 8–13 Hz (alpha wave) background rhythm.

== Definition ==
Some experts define microsleep according to behavioral criteria (head nods, drooping eyelids, etc.), while others rely on EEG markers. Since there are many ways to detect microsleeps in a variety of contexts there is little agreement on how best to identify and classify microsleep episodes.

== Causes ==
Microsleeps frequently occur as a result of sleep deprivation. However, individuals who are not sleep-deprived or tired can also experience microsleeps during monotonous tasks.

== Effects ==
Microsleep is extremely dangerous when it occurs in situations that demand constant alertness, such as driving a motor vehicle or working with heavy machinery. People who experience microsleeps often remain unaware of them, instead believing themselves to have been awake the whole time, or to have temporarily lost focus.

== Background and significance ==
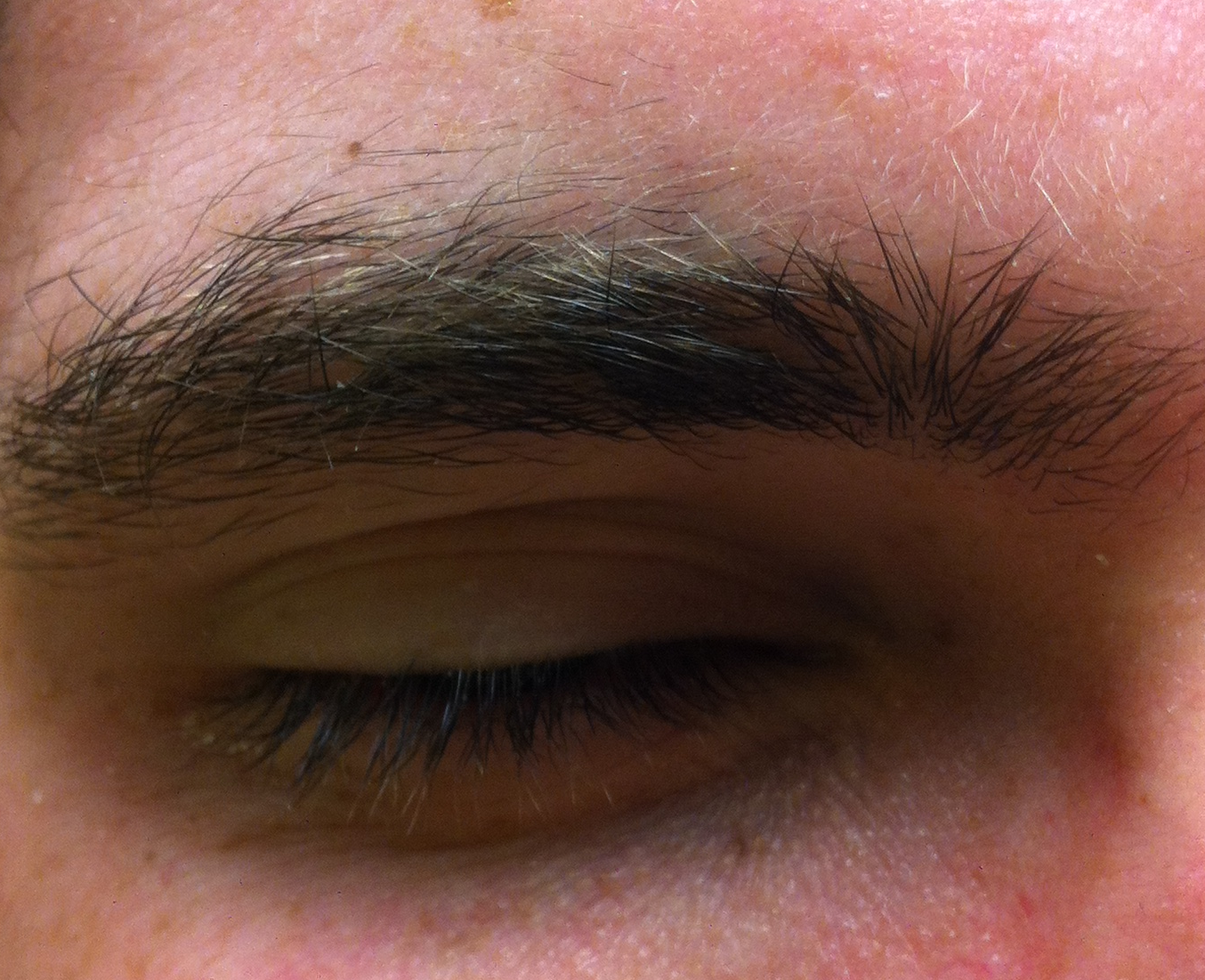
Eyelid closed, demonstrating microsleep event according to eye-video test

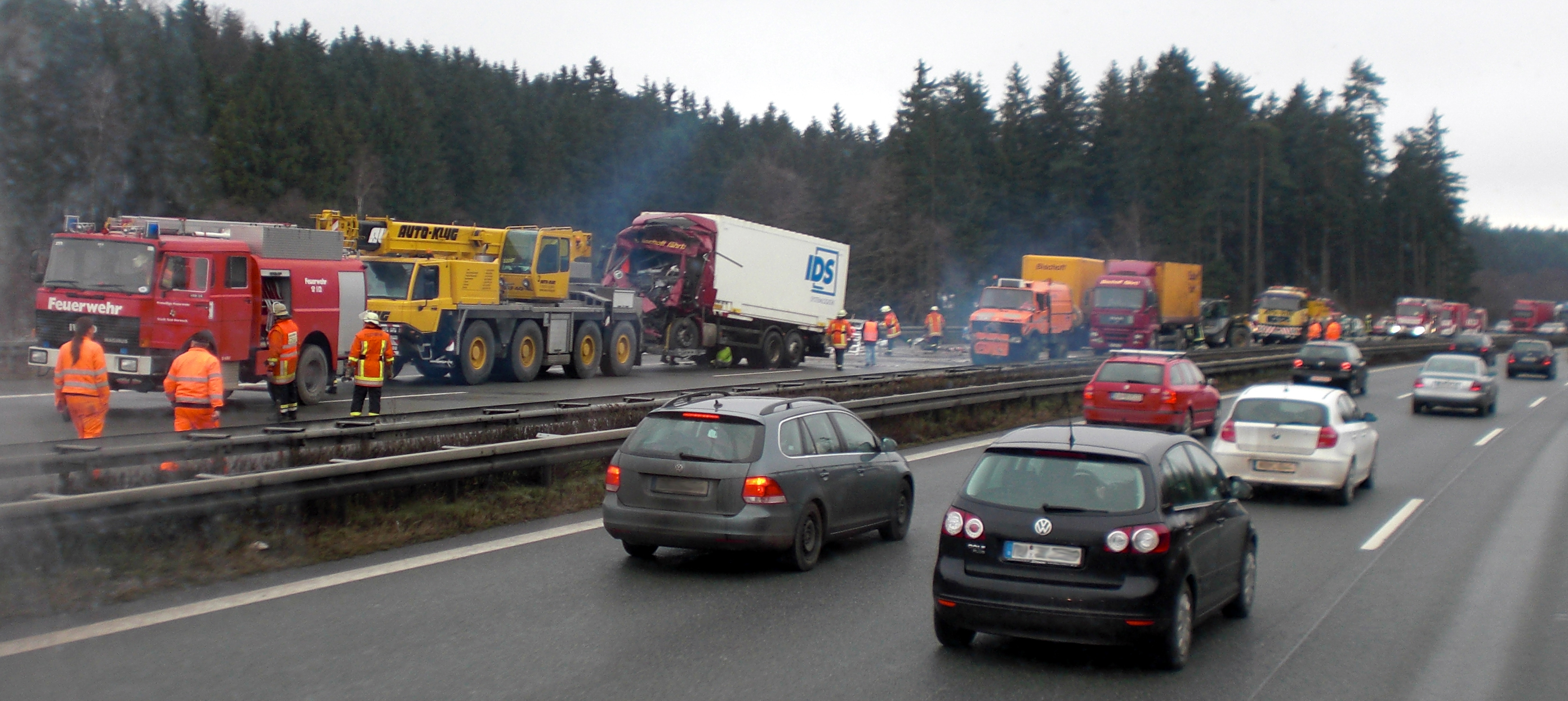
Traffic collision, a possible consequence of microsleep

With over 1,550 fatalities and 40,000 nonfatal injuries occurring annually in the United States alone as a result of drowsy driving, sleep loss has become a public health problem. When experiencing microsleeps while driving an automobile, from the perspective of the driver, they are driving a car, and then suddenly realize that several seconds have passed by unnoticed. It is not obvious to the driver that they were asleep during those missing seconds, although this is in fact what happened. The sleeping driver is at very high risk for having a collision during a microsleep episode.

Historically, many accidents and catastrophes have resulted from microsleep episodes in these circumstances. For example, a microsleep episode is claimed to have been one factor contributing to the Waterfall rail accident in 2003; the driver had a heart attack, and the guard who should have reacted to the train's increasing speed is said by his defender to have microslept, thus causing him to be held unaccountable. A possible microsleep was recorded as part of the narrative verdict in the inquest into the 2016 Croydon tram derailment.

Thus, microsleeps are often examined in the context of driver drowsiness detection and prevention of work-related injuries and public safety incidents (e.g. truck crashes, locomotive crashes, airplane crashes, etc.). Some statistics are below:

- 44% of drivers during late-night driving become dangerously sleepy.
- Extremely fatiguing work protocols increase accident probability from near 0% to 35%.
- Chronic microsleeps not only increase probability for injury but also decrease worker productivity and increase likelihood for absenteeism from work.
- According to one Centers for Disease Control and Prevention (CDC) study, among 74,571 adult respondents in 12 U.S. states, 35.3% reported <7 hours of sleep during a typical 24-hour period, 48.0% reported snoring, 37.9% reported unintentionally falling asleep during the day at least once in the preceding month, and 4.7% reported nodding off or falling asleep while driving at least once in the preceding month.
- The National Highway Traffic Safety Administration estimates that 2.5% of fatal crashes and 2% of injury crashes involve drowsy driving.
- Fatigue is associated with 250 fatalities in air carrier accidents in the last 16 years.

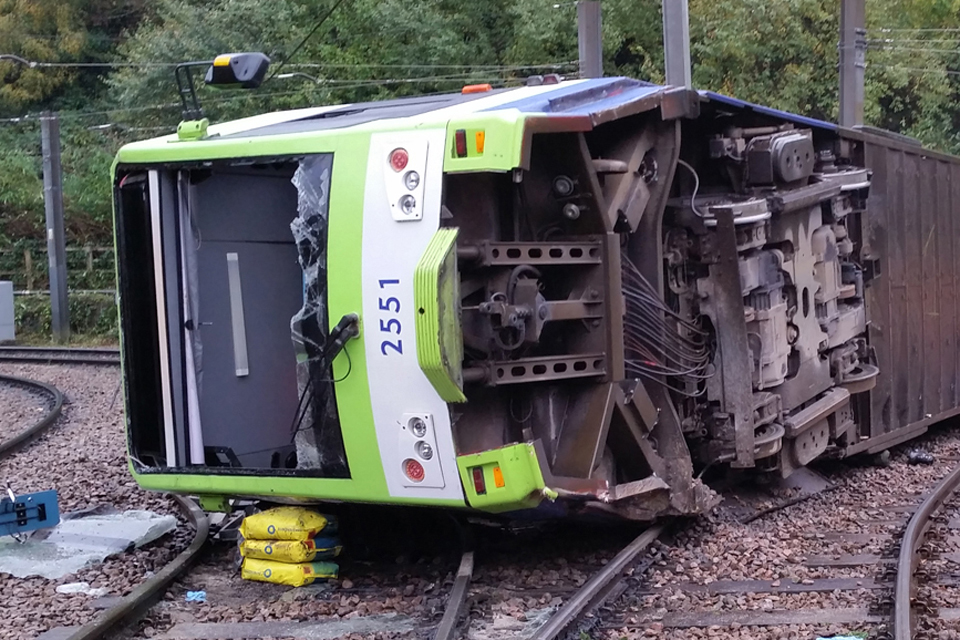
The 2016 Croydon tram derailment, a result of a suspected microsleep afflicting the driver

Microsleep episodes are not dangerous in and of themselves. The risk comes from the potential that they carry to cause incidents resulting from lack of awareness. If an individual has occurrences of microsleep in an environment that is free from potential environmental risk and its associated consequences, then episodes of microsleep should be non-problematic.

== Neural correlates ==
Generally, microsleeps are characterized by a decrease in activity in wakefulness-related regions of the brain and an increase in activity in sleep-related regions of the brain. Looking at neural correlates of microsleeps is difficult because microsleeps can also be triggered by monotonous tasks (e.g. such as driving or dozing off in class). Therefore, it is important to examine neural correlates of microsleep events with respect to experimental set-ups (such as simulated driving tests and reaction time tests). Individual variability in brain structure also makes it difficult to diagnose microsleep events objectively.

In one study, neural activity underlying microsleeps was investigated by simultaneously measuring eye video, response behavior, EEG, and fMRI in normally-rested individuals engaged in a sensory-motor task. Twenty participants tracked a visual stimulus with a joystick for 50 minutes in 2 dimensions (up/down/right/left) on a computer screen. Participants performed this task in an fMRI scanner such that joystick response, right eye-video, EEG (60 EEG electrodes), and fMRI data were recorded simultaneously. Most participants had frequent microsleeps (>35) in a continuous visuomotor task (tracking visual stimulus on a screen), corresponding with decreased activity in arousal-related brain regions over time (thalamus, midbrain, and the posterior cingulate cortex).

Another study examined the activation patterns of 5 people who woke up from microsleeps in a simulated driving experiment. It was found that upon awakening the visual area, frontal cortex, limbic lobe were activated (in the intense activation phase) and the frontal cortex, temporal cortex, primary motor area, and insula were activated (in the post abrupt awakening phase). Therefore, the study concluded that decision-making was not activated immediately upon waking up from a microsleep episode, likely increasing risk of injury in intense decision-making tasks like driving or surgery.

The transition from wakefulness to sleep is regulated by a variety of chemicals. Adenosine likely causes the 'feeling sleepy' side of microsleeps, while dopamine likely reduces microsleep events by promoting wakefulness. It has been shown that microsleeps correlate with spontaneous pontine-geniculate-occipital (PGO waves) waves, which suppress visual processing in the basal ganglia. When this pathway is not activated, cells in the superior colliculus (which causes release of dopamine) cannot be dis-inhibited via the basal ganglia, leading to poor processing ability and microsleep onset.

== Detection methods and classifications ==
There are currently many ways to detect microsleeps; however, there is a lack of general consensus as to the best way to identify and classify microsleeps. The simplest methods to detect these events seem to be through psychological tests, speech tests, and behavioral tests (e.g. yawn test and eye-video test). More complex and expensive ways to detect microsleeps include EEG, fMRI, EOG, and PSG tied to various software platforms. When multiple tests are used in parallel, detection of microsleeps most likely will become more accurate.

| Method | Description or examples |
|---|---|
| Polysomnography (PSG) | PSG monitors many body functions including brain (EEG), eye movements (EOG), muscle activity or skeletal muscle activation (EMG) and heart rhythm (ECG) during sleep. |
| Electroencephalography (EEG) | EEG records the brain's spontaneous electrical activity over a short period of time, usually 20–40 minutes, as recorded from multiple electrodes on the scalp. Microsleeps have EEG shift to slower frequencies (from alpha to theta waves). |
| Functional magnetic resonance imaging (fMRI) | A functional neuroimaging procedure using MRI technology that measures brain activity by detecting associated changes in blood flow (detects what regions of brain are active during microsleep events). |
| Psychological tests | Reaction time test, Karolinska Sleepiness Scale (KSS), Maintenance of Wakefulness Test (MWT), Multiple Sleep Latency Test (MSLT). |
| Electrooculogram (EOG) | EOG is a technique for measuring the resting potential of the retina in the human eye. |
| Eye-video test | Measures eyes blinking and eye movements to detect microsleep events. |
| Mouth yawning test | Counts number of yawns over a period of time. |
| Speech tests | Examines emotions and/or prosody in speech to predict microsleep episodes. |

Despite attempts to globally classify microsleeps through these detection methods (with particular emphasis on EEG and slow eyelid closure tests), there is great variability in the types of microsleeps that people experience. Subjective, self-reported psychological tests like the Karolinska Sleepiness Scale (KSS), though widely adopted and positively correlated to EEG, often have limited utility because individuals sometimes are not aware of their level of sleepiness. Future research needs to focus more on objective microstates (e.g. detailed electrical output in briefer intervals) that underlie microsleep events so that electrical events can be understood in terms of behavioral events with greater accuracy. Then microsleep events could be more seamlessly distinguished from other states of consciousness, such as silent consciousness experienced during meditation.

== Disorders, clinical studies, and pharmacology ==
Microsleeps are often tied to disorders. Sleep apnea is by far the most significant disease tied to microsleeps in terms of prevalence, affecting roughly 10–15 million people. Other disorders that may be tied to microsleeps include narcolepsy, hypersomnia, schizophrenia, and other causes of excessive daytime sleepiness. Microsleep episodes are often neglected and are not used as a diagnostic indicator for these disorders. Instead, clinicians use instrumentation like PSG to do a sleep study on patients to assess overall sleep quality in a laboratory setting.

Microsleeps that recur and negatively influence day-to-day living often are clustered into the category of excessive daytime sleepiness. Thus, most clinical studies related to microsleeps are in the context of reducing microsleeps in excessive daytime sleepiness through the use of pharmacological interventions. Particularly, modafinil has become a popular drug to reduce microsleeps due to its eugeroic effect with comparatively mild side effects relative to classical psychostimulants. New drugs are often compared to the results of modafinil and placebo to assess efficacy (e.g. methylphenidate in Parkinson's Disease). Modafinil is also being tested across a range of disorders such as schizophrenia, narcolepsy, cataplexy, and sleep apnea. Overall, the trajectory of clinical studies relating to negative symptom microsleeps seems to more thoroughly test modafinil across more disorders and compare new drugs to the efficacy of modafinil to reduce the negative effects of microsleeps on people across a spectrum of disorders.

| Title | Interventions | Conditions |
|---|---|---|
| Effects of BF2.649 in the Treatment of Excessive Daytime Sleepiness in Narcolepsy. | Drug: BF2.649, Drug: Modafinil, Drug: Placebo | Treatment of Excessive Daytime Sleepiness in Narcolepsy. |
| Efficacy and Safety Study of BF2.649 in the Treatment of Excessive Daytime Sleepiness in Narcolepsy | Drug: BF2.649, Modafinil, Placebo | Narcolepsy, Excessive Daytime Sleepiness, Cataplexy, Sleep Disorders |
| Dose Range Finding Study of BF2.649 Versus Placebo to Treat Excessive Daytime Sleepiness in Parkinson's Disease Patients | Drug: Placebo, Drug: BF 2.649 5 mg, Drug: BF 2.649 10 mg, Drug: BF 2.649 20 mg, Drug: BF 2.649 40 mg | Excessive Daytime Sleepiness, Parkinson's disease |
| A Study Of A Novel Compound For Excessive Daytime Sleepiness Associated With Narcolepsy | Drug: Placebo, Drug: PF-03654746 | Excessive Daytime Sleepiness, Narcolepsy |
| Treatment of Refractory Excessive Daytime Sleepiness in Patients With Obstructive Sleep Apnea/Hypopnea Syndrome (OSA/HS) Using Nasal Continuous Positive Airway Pressure (nCPAP) Therapy (0249-015) | Comparator: MK0249, Drug: Comparator: placebo, Drug: Comparator: modafinil | Sleep Apnea (Obstructive), Hypopnea Syndrome, Excessive Daytime Sleepiness |
| Pitolisant to Assess Weekly Frequency of Cataplexy Attacks and EDS in Narcoleptic Patients (HARMONY CTP) | Drug: Pitolisant, Drug: Placebo | Narcolepsy with Cataplexy, Excessive Daytime Sleepiness |
| Comparison of Modafinil and Methylphenidate in Treatment of Excessive Daytime Sleepiness in Patients With Parkinson's Disease | Drug: modafinil, Drug: methylphenidate | Parkinson's Disease |
| Modafinil Augmentation Therapy for Excessive Daytime Sleepiness and Negative Symptoms in Patients With Schizophrenia | Drug: Modafinil, Drug: Placebo | Schizophrenia |
| Efficacy and Safety of BF2.649 in Excessive Daytime Sleepiness (EDS) in Parkinson's Disease | Drug: BF2.649 (Pitolisant) | Parkinson's Disease |
| Trial of Xyrem for Excessive Daytime Sleepiness and Sleep Disturbance in Parkinson's Disease (PD) | Drug: sodium oxybate | Parkinson's Disease |

Microsleeps sometimes are a side effect of various drugs, particularly in reference to dopamine-stimulating drugs in Parkinson's Disease. Particularly, somnolence is a recognized adverse effect of dopamine agonists, pramipexole and ropinirole. These drugs are known to cause sudden-onset sleep spells in roughly 50% of patients with Parkinson's disease (PD) while they were driving. Therefore, clinical interventions pertaining to microsleeps may also encompass reducing excessive sleepiness as a side effect of drug administration. Orexin antagonists such as daridorexant and suvorexant may cause hypersomnolence and microsleeps.

Most microsleeps are not clinically significant, however. Individuals who feel sleepy and wish to maintain alertness often consume over-the-counter stimulants such as caffeine in coffee. More specifically, it has been shown that high-frequency low-dose caffeine intake is effective at countering poor work performance effects due to extended wakefulness, confirming the hypothesis that adenosine is a mediator of performance decrements associated with extended wakefulness. Other stimulants that could decrease microsleep frequency include Adderall, amphetamine, cocaine, and tobacco.

== See also ==
- Drowsiness
- Hypnic jerk
- Microarousal
- Sleep apnea
- Sleep debt
- Vigilance
