= Paul Tholey =

German psychologist

Paul Tholey

Paul Tholey (14 March 1937 – 7 December 1998) was a German Gestalt psychologist, and a professor of psychology and sports science at the University of Frankfurt and the Technical University of Braunschweig.

Tholey started the study of oneirology in an attempt to prove that dreams occur in color. Given the unreliability of dream memories and following the critical realism approach, he used lucid dreaming as an epistemological tool for investigating dreams, in a similar fashion to Stephen LaBerge. He devised the reflection technique for inducing lucid dreams, consisting in continuously suspecting waking life to be a dream, in the hope that such a habit would manifest itself during dreams.

Tholey's research included the examination of the cognitive abilities of dreamers, as well as the cognitive abilities of dream figures. In the latter study, nine trained lucid dreamers were directed to set other dream figures arithmetic and verbal tasks during lucid dreaming (Cognitive abilities of dream figures in lucid dreams, 1983). Dream figures who agreed to perform the tasks proved more successful in verbal than in arithmetic tasks.

== Bibliography ==
- Techniques for inducing and manipulating lucid dreams. Perceptual and Motor Skills, 57, 1983, pp 79–90.
- Relation between dream content and eye movements tested by lucid dreams. Perceptual and Motor Skills, 56, 1983, pp 875–878.
- Cognitive abilities of dream figures in lucid dreams. Lucidity Letter, 71, 1983.
- Overview of the Development of Lucid Dream Research in Germany . Lecture at the VI. International Conference of the Association for the Study of Dreams in London 1989. First published in: Lucidity Letter, 8(2) (1989), pp 1–30.
- Conversation Between Stephen LaBerge and Tholey in July 1989. B. Holzinger (ed.). Lucidity, 10(1&2), 1991, pp 62–71.
- A complete bibliography of articles in German, some of which have been translated into French, English, Hungarian.
- Gestalttheorie von Sport, Klartraum und Bewusstsein. Ausgewählte Arbeiten, herausgegeben und eingeleitet von Gerhard Stemberger ("Gestalt theory of sports. lucid dreaming, and consciousness. Selected works, edited and introduced by Gerhard Stemberger"). Wien: Krammer 2018. ISBN 9783901811760. Full text of Contents and Introduction (in German).
