= Stephen LaBerge =

American psychophysiologist (born 1947)

- Citizenship: United States of America
- Education: Stanford University
- Known for: Oneirology, Lucid dreaming
- Scientific career
- Fields: Psychophysiology

Stephen LaBerge (born 1947) is an American psychophysiologist specializing in the scientific study of lucid dreaming. In 1967 he received his bachelor's degree in mathematics. He began researching lucid dreaming for his Ph.D. in psychophysiology at Stanford University, which he received in 1980. He developed techniques to enable himself and other researchers to enter a lucid dream state at will, most notably the MILD technique (mnemonic induction of lucid dreams), which was used in many forms of dream experimentation. In 1987, he founded The Lucidity Institute, an organization that promotes research into lucid dreaming, as well as running courses for the general public on how to achieve a lucid dream.

In the early 1980s, news of LaBerge's research using the technique of signalling to a collaborator monitoring his EEG with agreed-upon eye movements during REM helped to popularise lucid dreaming in the American media.

Wired magazine referred to him as the "Thomas Edison of lucid dreaming".

== Research results ==
Results from LaBerge's lab and others include:

- comparison of subjective sense of time in dreams versus the waking state using eye signals
- comparison of electrical activity in the brain when singing while awake, and while in a dream
- various studies comparing physiological sexual arousal and in-dream sex and orgasm

== Lucid dreaming education and facilitation ==
LaBerge developed a series of devices to help users enter a lucid state while dreaming. The original device was called a DreamLight, which was discontinued in favor of the NovaDreamer, designed by experienced lucid dreamer Craig Webb for the Lucidity Institute while he worked there and participated in lucid dreaming research at Stanford. As of 2013 it was not possible to purchase these devices from the Lucidity Institute website. An improved version, the NovaDreamer II, is a mask with flashing lights that measures eye movement.

All of the devices consist of a mask worn over the eyes with LEDs positioned over the eyelids. The LEDs flash whenever the mask detects that the wearer has entered REM sleep. The stimulus is incorporated into the wearer's dreams and can be recognised as a sign that they are dreaming.

LaBerge currently lectures at universities and other professional institutions, and hosts lucid dreaming sessions at various locations.

== Bibliography ==
LaBerge has produced several books and tapes about lucid dreaming.

- LaBerge, Stephen (1985). Lucid Dreaming: The power of being aware and awake in your dreams. J.P. Tarcher. ISBN 0-87477-342-3.
- LaBerge, Stephen; Rheingold, Howard (1990). Exploring the World of Lucid Dreaming. National Geographic Books. ISBN 0-345-37410-X.
- LaBerge, Stephen (2004). Lucid Dreaming: A Concise Guide to Awakening in Your Dreams and in Your Life. ISBN 1-59179-150-2.
