= Jacques de Waru =

French equestrian (1865-1911)

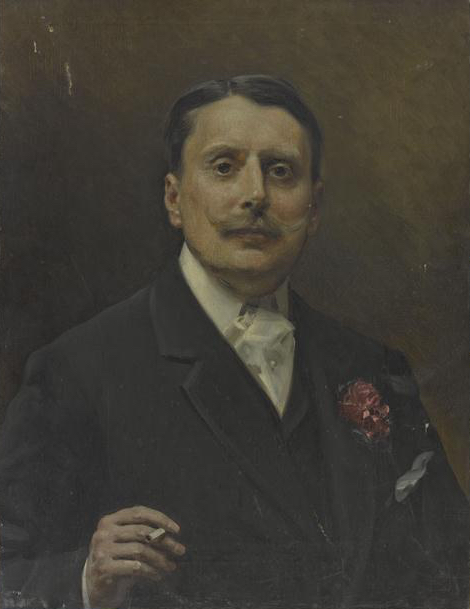
- Portrait of Jacques de Waru

Personal information
- Nationality: French
- Born: 23 November 1865 Vaux-sur-Seine, Yvelines, France
- Died: 21 May 1911 (aged 45) Rambouillet, Yvelines, France

Sport
- Sport: Equestrian

Jacques Laurens de Waru (23 November 1865 – 21 May 1911) was a French equestrian. He competed in the equestrian mail coach event at the 1900 Summer Olympics.
