= Tinbergen =

Tinbergen is a Dutch surname, and may refer to:

- Jan Tinbergen (1903–1994), Dutch economist
- Jaap Tinbergen (1934–2010), Dutch astronomer, after whom minor planet 10434 Tinbergen was named.
- Joost Tinbergen (born 1950), Dutch ecologist
- Luuk Tinbergen (1915–1955), Dutch ornithologist
- Nikolaas Tinbergen (1907–1988), Dutch biologist
- Tijs Tinbergen (born 1947), Dutch filmmaker

== Other uses ==
- Tinbergen's four questions
- Tinbergen Institute
- 10434 Tinbergen

== See also ==
- Sabriye Tenberken
