= Hans Baruch =

American physiologist (1925–2013)

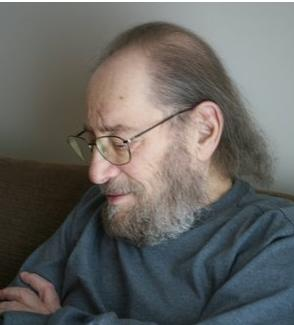
- Born: 16 September 1925; Hamburg, Germany
- Died: 6 June 2013 (aged 87); Berkeley, California, U.S.
- Education: University of California-Berkeley
- Known for: Automatic clinical chemical analyzers
- Scientific career
- Fields: Physiology, Instrument Invention & Design
- Workplaces: Brooklyn College; University of California-Berkeley; Research Specialties Co., Richmond, CA
- Doctoral advisor: I.L. Chaikoff

Hans Baruch (September 16, 1925 – June 6, 2013) was an American physiologist/inventor, noted mainly for his contributions to scientific apparatus and instruments in the field of automated clinical chemistry. His Robot Chemist "was the first commercially available discrete analyzer, and probably the first to produce results with a digital print-out."

Automatic discrete analysis instrumentation revolutionized the field of clinical chemistry, and, eventually, the practice of medicine, as well.

== Biography ==
=== Early life ===
Hans Baruch, born in 1925 and raised in Hamburg, Germany, immigrated to the United States in 1938. He was admitted to the Bronx High School of Science (class of 1942), a newly founded (1938) school for students thought to be talented in the sciences. The entrance examinations for this school were quite rigorous and only a small percentage of applicants was admitted. After graduating from The Bronx High School of Science (June, 1942), Baruch attended Brooklyn College, where he met Abraham Maslow and quickly became one of his research assistants. Although Maslow was already interested in the hierarchy of basic needs, at that time his interests included human dominance and security, as well as self-esteem. Baruch acquired a practical and theoretical knowledge of statistics while helping to develop tests to measure those traits.

In November 1943 Baruch was drafted into the United States Army, serving until November 1945, and was awarded the Bronze Star Medal, the Prisoner of War Medal, as well as 3 battle stars for his service in the European Theater of War. He served within the 106th Infantry Division and was a part of the 424th Infantry Regiment, Company A. Baruch was captured in the first days of the Battle of the Bulge in December 1944 near Winterspelt, Germany. He was initially brought to Stalag XIIA where he was interrogated with other members of his company by the SS. Baruch was a member of the Ritchie Boys—a special military intelligence unit composed primarily of German-speaking immigrants. Exposure of his role and identity put him at great risk, and examples of war crimes committed against two other 'Ritchie Boys' of the 106th Infantry Division were witnessed in captured infantry regiments adjacent to his own during the Battle of the Bulge.

Prior to discharge from the U.S. Army, Baruch was posted to Ft. DuPont, Delaware, where he was put in charge of the clinical laboratory of the post hospital. It was this experience that led him to start thinking about mechanizing clinical chemistry.

=== Post World War II ===
After discharge from the U.S. Army, Baruch enrolled at the University of California, Berkeley, where he continued his studies in psychology until he met Nikolaas Tinbergen at a seminar. At that seminar (1946) Tinbergen described his experiments performed during World War II in the Netherlands under the German occupation. Then, materials and equipment were scarce, so Tinbergen had to work under relatively primitive conditions. The experiments he performed on new-born baby chicks and cardboard cutouts that were moved back and forth along an overhead wire resulted in what is now known as the "hawk/goose effect."

The above-described experiments so affected Baruch that he decided to change fields and study biology and chemistry, a change consistent with his thinking along these lines that had begun during his army service.

Shortly after his arrival in California, Baruch met, and then married, Flora Krauzer (January 26, 1918 - January 17, 2011). They have three children, twin boys, David and Duncan, and a girl, Claudia Kimbrough.

In 1951, as a graduate student, Baruch invented a new incubation flask for metabolic studies on tissue slices. That incubation flask was described by Baruch and Chaikoff and was adopted in numerous laboratories throughout the U.S.A. (See the paper by E.D. Neville and D.D. Feller.) In that paper the authors state: "The incubation flask described by Baruch and Chaikoff (1) for tissue slices and decarboxylation studies has gained widespread popularity." In other publications the flask was simply described as the "Baruch flask."(e.g. Baker, N., et al.)

In the period from 1951-1953 Baruch worked in the fields of lipid metabolism and carbohydrate metabolism (cf. P.F. Hirsch, H. Baruch, and I.L. Chaikoff and Hans Baruch and I.L. Chaikoff)

In 1953 Dr. Baruch decided to leave academic life because he found its constraints incompatible with his ideals and his character. In the same year he founded Research Specialties Co., devoted solely to the design and manufacture of scientific instruments. This new enterprise grew quickly and became one of the leading manufacturers of apparatus and instruments in the fields of paper chromatography, liquid chromatography and gas chromatography, as well as some other instruments used in the biological sciences. Baruch's designs for gas chromatography instruments introduced the concept of modular design that has become standard in the industry.

By 1954 the concept of an automatic discrete sample analyzer had become sufficiently concrete in his mind that Baruch began work on actual design. Construction of prototypes began in 1956 and design, development, and engineering continued until 1959 when the first units of the Robot Chemist were sold commercially. It was at this juncture that a theoretical competition began between the continuous flow concept of analysis (CFA) and the discrete sample analysis concept of the Robot Chemist. At first, it appeared that CFA would prevail, but it turned out that "it was the discrete sample concept of the Robot Chemist that eventually was adopted by instrument designers and manufacturers and achieved the dominant position in the clinical laboratory."

A detailed description of all the components and features of the Robot Chemist exceeds the scope of this article. Therefore, we shall give a brief explanation of the apparatus and instruments, providing references to the Baruch patents involved in that equipment.

The original Robot Chemist, marketed in 1959, was a desk-sized instrument that appeared to be too large for general acceptance. Thus, a much smaller, desk-top unit was designed in 1958-1962 and first marketed in 1963. This latter instrument contained the first precipitation-filtration unit ever sold commercially in order to provide protein-free blood for analysis of blood components that could not be analyzed in the presence of proteins.

The desk-top Robot Chemist consisted of four main components:

1) The Precipitation-filtration module described in U.S. patent #3,282,431 (see Bibliography for this and the following other units mentioned.)

2) The Sample processing module described in U.S. patent #3192968

3) The spectrophotometer

4) The digital print-out unit was the first digital printout made commercially for automatic clinical analyzers.

In order to provide the reader with some idea of how the Robot Chemist functioned in a clinical chemical laboratory setting, the following references might be useful.

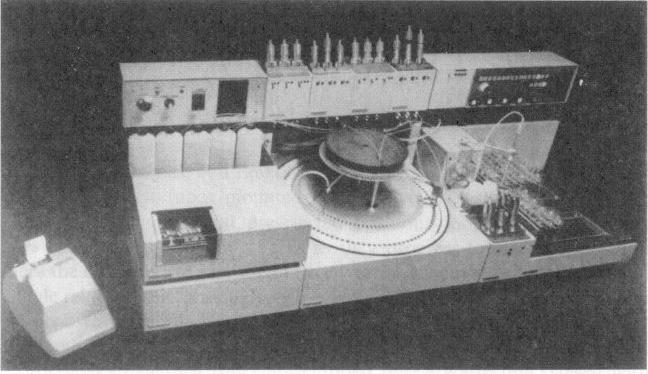
Robot Chemist

By early 1963 it had become obvious to Baruch that a really successful commercial development of a robot chemist was only possible with an infusion of substantial new capital into Research Specialties Company. The board of directors of the now publicly owned company was unwilling to provide further investments in the company, as they were (with the exception of one or two) only interested in short-term profits. At scientific meetings and trade shows Baruch met representatives of PerkinElmer and Warner Lambert Pharmaceutical Corporation, both of whom evinced an interest in acquiring Research Specialties Co. He was invited to visit PerkinElmer, and there met Chester W Nimitz Jr, who was the chief executive officer of that company. They immediately became friends, and Baruch decided that he could work with Nimitz in a productive manner. At the same time he expressed strong doubts about Warner Lambert's ability to manage successfully a complex scientific instrument company such as Research Specialties. Nevertheless, the board of directors of Research Specialties Company decided to pursue its acquisition by Warner-Lambert. In an interview with Dr. Baruch he called this course "an egregious decision by a massively ignorant Board." Because he could not see a useful future with the company, he resigned from Research Specialties in early 1964.

=== Post-Research Specialties Co. ===
After leaving the company Baruch turned first to business and technical consulting with a number of firms. Starting in the late 1960s, he became interested in computer programming, and this discipline occupied him for the next 25 years, during which time he wrote numerous software programs for application to controlling specialized business and technical/scientific needs; during 1975 he served for a short time as education director of the Alameda County, California Data Processing Center. He also designed some instruments for laboratories, one of which, a precision liquid dispensing device, (marketed under the name "Jet Pipet") sold many tens of thousands.

In 2003 Baruch published his last peer-reviewed scientific paper, together with his old friend and research partner Philip F. Hirsch. This paper was a theoretical one, questioning the physiological importance of the hormone calcitonin.

== Bibliography ==
Baruch, H.; Chaikoff, I. L. (1954), "A simplified method for determination of lipid-C^{14} in liver", Proceedings of the Society for Experimental Biology and Medicine, vol. 86, pp. 97–99

Hirsch, Philip; Baruch, Hans; Chaikoff, I.L. (1954), "The Relation of Glucose Oxidation to Lipogenesis in Mammary Tissue", The Journal of Biological Chemistry, vol. 210, no. 2, pp. 785–797, PMID 13211617

Baruch, Hans; Chaikoff, I.L. (1955), "Lipogenesis and CO_{2} Formation from Acetate in the Liver of the Hypophysectomized Rat", Endocrinology, vol. 56, no. 5, pp. 609–611, doi:10.1210/endo-56-5-609, PMID 14365719

US 3192968, Baruch, Hans & Travaglio, Dalny, "Apparatus for conducting analytical procedures", issued 1965

US 3192969, Baruch, Hans & Anthon, Erik, "Automatic sample handling apparatus", issued 1965

US 3193358, Baruch, Hans, "Automated analytical apparatus", issued 1965

US 3193359, Baruch, Hans & Travaglio, Dalny, "Apparatus for conducting analytical procedural steps", issued 1965

US 3225645, Baruch, Hans & Anthon, Erik, "Cuvette and supply system therefor", issued 1965

US 3263553, Baruch, Hans, "Photoelectric immersion probe", issued 1966

US 3282431, Baruch, Hans & Travaglio, Dalny, "Sample conveying and conditioning unit", issued 1966

Hirsch, Philip. F.; Baruch, Hans (2003), "Is Calcitonin an Important Physiological substance?", Endocrine, vol. 21, no. 3, pp. 201–208, doi:10.1385/ENDO:21:3:201, PMID 14515002, S2CID 40454936
