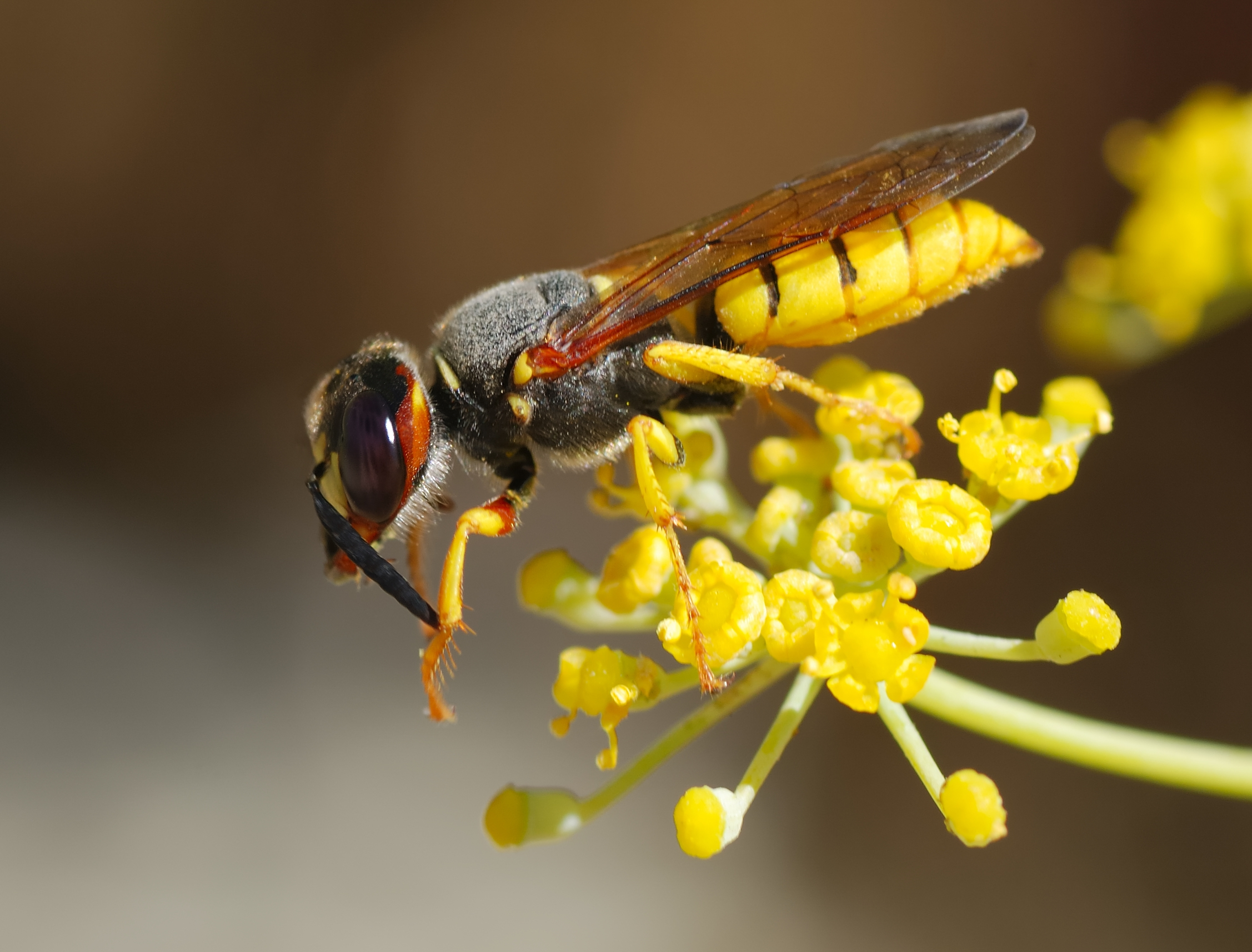
- A European beewolf
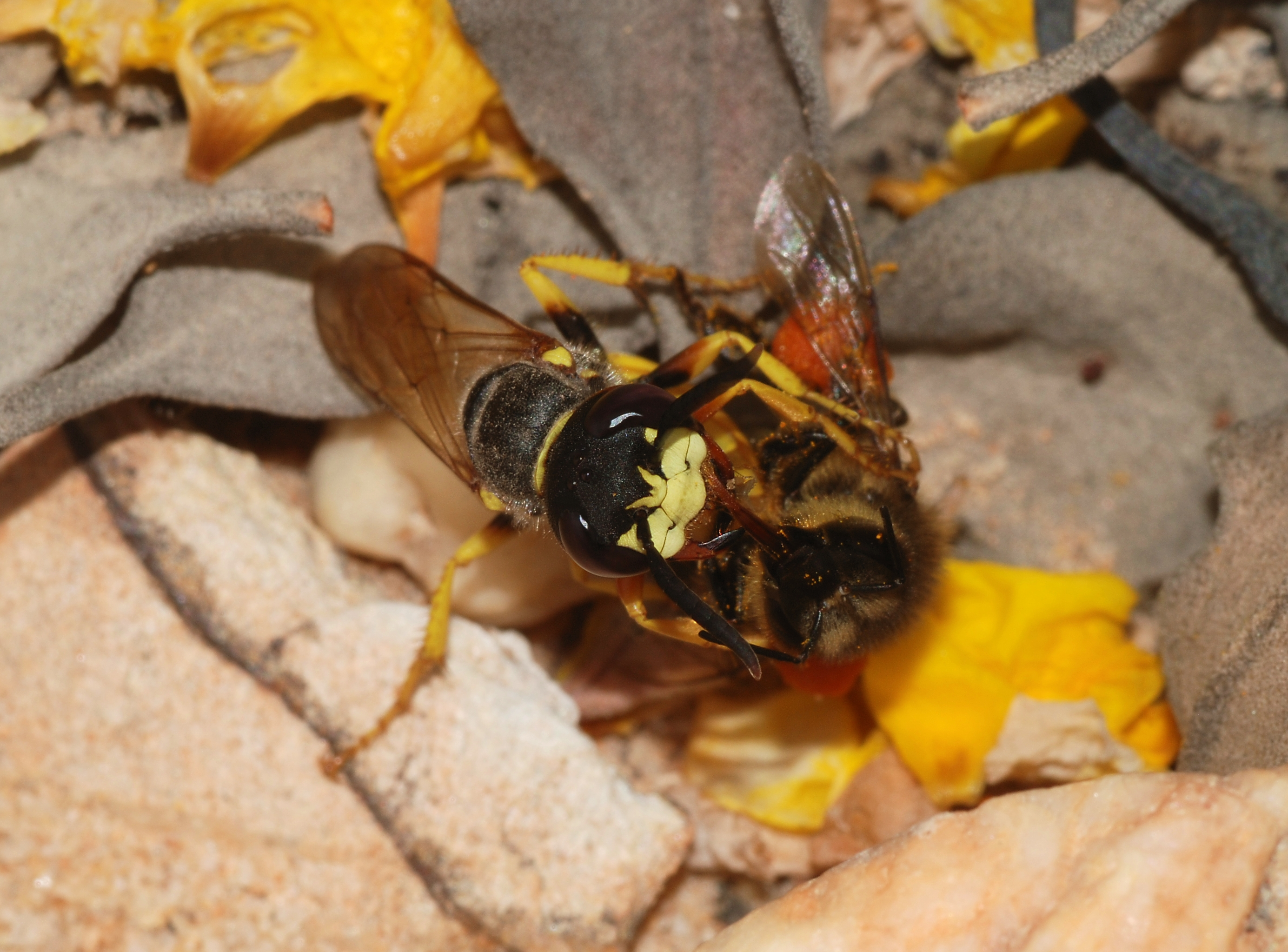
- European beewolf paralysing a bee

Scientific classification
- Kingdom: Animalia
- Phylum: Arthropoda
- Clade: Pancrustacea
- Class: Insecta
- Order: Hymenoptera
- Family: Philanthidae
- Genus: Philanthus
- Species: P. triangulum

Binomial name
- Philanthus triangulum (Fabricius, 1775)

Synonyms
- Philanthus abdelcader Lepeletier, 1845; Philanthus allionii Dahlbom, 1845; Philanthus apivorus Latreille, 1799; Philanthus discolor Panzer, 1799; Philanthus pictus Panzer, 1797; Crabro androgynus Rossi, 1792; Philanthus ruspatrix (Linnaeus, 1767); Simblephilus triangulum (Fabricius, 1775); Sphex scutellatus subsp. maculatus Christ, 1791; Vespa fasciata Fourcroy, 1785; Vespa limbata Olivier, 1792; Vespa ruspatrix Linné, 1767; Vespa triangulum Fabricius, 1775

= European beewolf =

Species of wasp

The European beewolf (Philanthus triangulum), also known as the bee-killer wasp or the bee-eating philanthus (from the now obsolete synonym Philanthus apivorus), is a solitary wasp that lives in the Western Palearctic and Afrotropics. Although the adults of the species are herbivores (feeding on nectar and pollen), the species derives its name from the behaviour of the inseminated females, who hunt western honey bees. The female places several of its paralysed prey together with an egg in a small underground chamber, to serve as food for the wasp larvae. All members of the genus Philanthus hunt various species of bees, but P. triangulum is apparently the only one that specialises in western honey bees.

== Identification ==
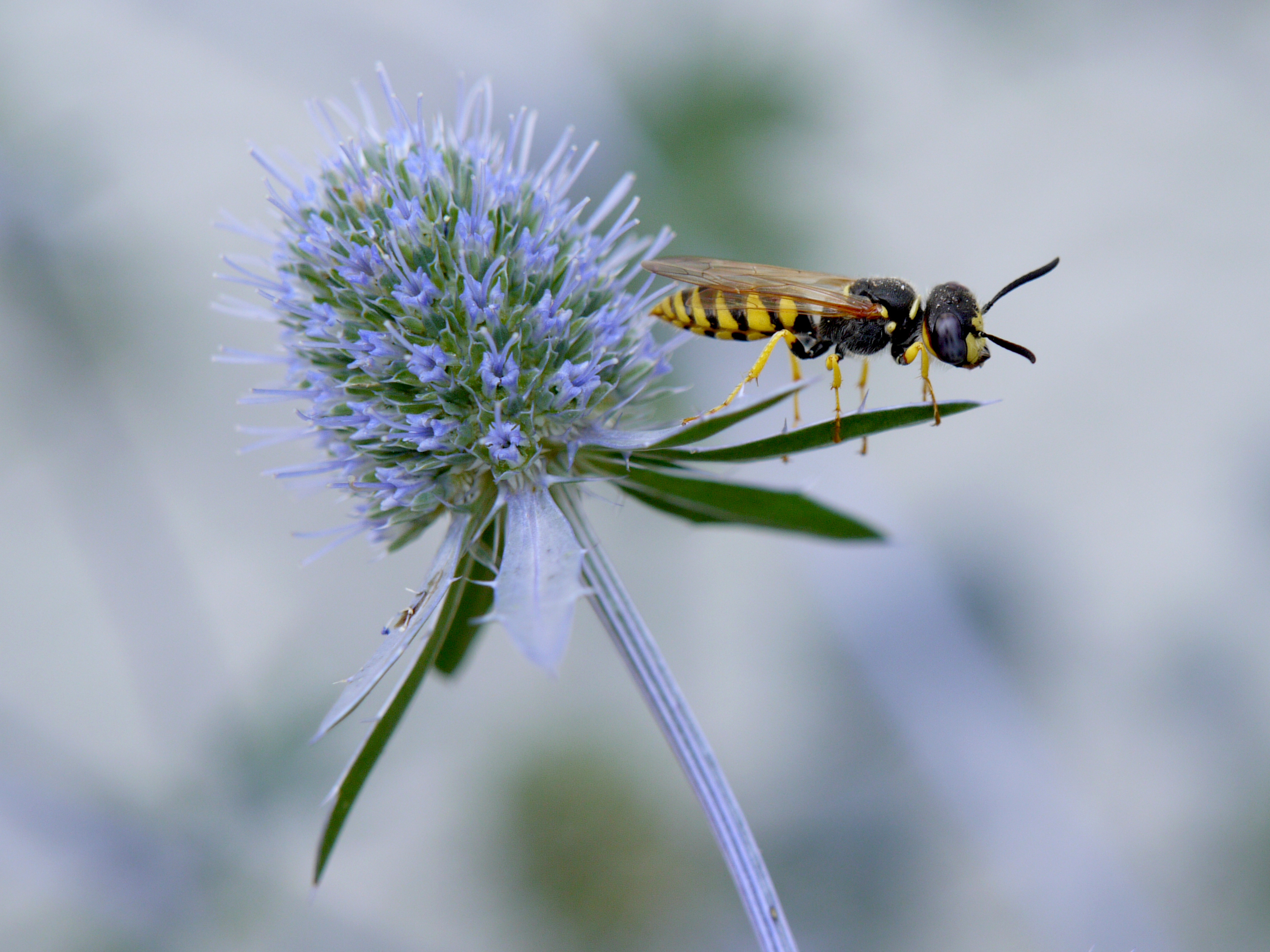
Male beewolf visiting a Eryngium flower

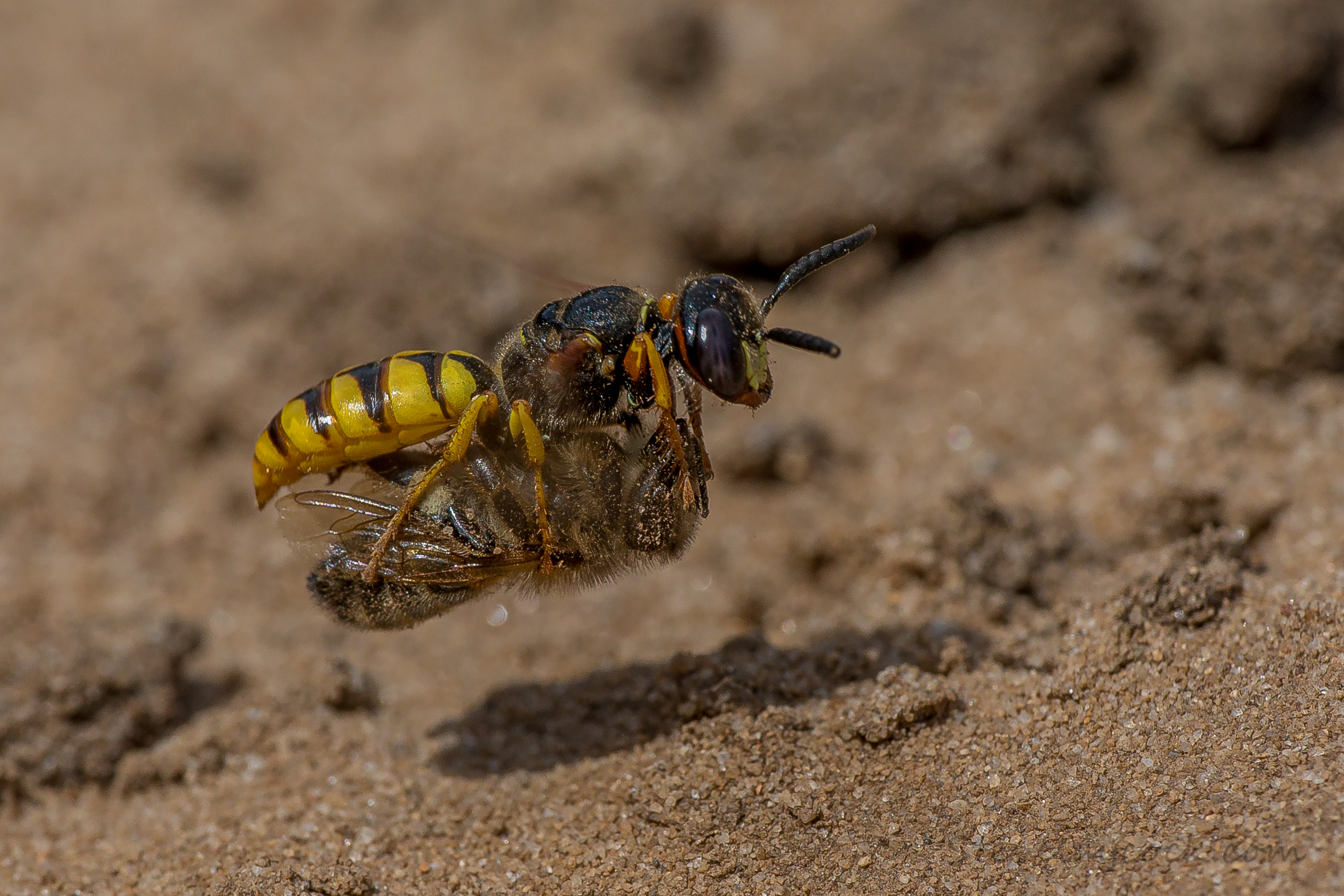
beewolf with honey bee

The European beewolf is a species of solitary wasp with bold yellow and black markings on the abdomen, males have trident-shaped markings between their bluish eyes while the larger females have a reddish stripe behind the eyes and a pale face.

== Habitat ==
The European beewolf is found mainly in areas of open sandy ground in areas such as lowland heathland and coastal dunes. They are infrequently found in clay areas and in Britain have been recorded digging burrows in coal dust and ash and have been found on spoil heaps from coal mining.

== Subspecies and distribution ==
The European beewolf has a wide distribution in the Afrotropical and Western Palearctic zoogeographical regions from Scandinavia to South Africa. In Europe its distribution has been moving northwards as summers have longer periods of warm weather.

There are currently five recognised subspecies:

- Philanthus triangulum abdelcader Lepeletier, 1845; northern Africa and the Middle East from Iraq westwards to the Atlantic and the Canary Islands this subspecies also occurs on the Italian island of Lampedusa;
- Philanthus triangulum bimaculatus Magretti, 1908; Kenya;
- Philanthus triangulum diadema (Fabricius 1781); the Afrotopics;
- Philanthus triangulum obliteratus Pic 1917; Algeria and Egypt:
- Philanthus triangulum triangulum (Fabricius, 1775); Europe.

== Biology ==
In the more northerly parts of its distribution, the European beewolf produces one brood a year and the flight period is between mid-July and September. In the warmer areas in which it occurs there can be more than one generation per year, for example, in Central Europe, there may be two broods in the summer.

Female European beewolves excavate their burrows in sandy soil or in vertical soil faces in open sunny places and these can be up to a metre in length with no less than three and as many as 34 short side tunnels at the end, each of which contains a brood cell. The material displaced by the burrowing wasp is flicked behind it as it excavates the nest. They nest in aggregations which may have as many as 15,000 burrows. The females hunt honey bees Apis mellifera, which are paralysed with the stinger, the female stings the prey through the articular membranes which are situated behind the front legs, the female then carries the immobilised bee to the nest in flight between the wasp's legs. On reaching the nest she often hovers over the entrance before slowly descending into the burrow. Each brood cell is provisioned with between one and five honey bees for the larva. After the larva has fed sufficiently it spins a cocoon, the cocoon is attached to the wall of the brood cell at its base. In cooler regions the larva overwinters and the adults emerge the following summer. Other species of bee, other than honey bees, have been reported as prey including Andrena flavipes, Lasioglossum zonulus and Nomada sp in Britain as well as bees of the genera Dasypoda, Halictus and Megachile in continental Europe. Each female may collect up to 100 bees during its flight period.

The humid and warm conditions in the brood cells provide good growth conditions a number of species of mould fungi which can colonise the cells opportunistically from the surrounding soil, especially Aspergillus flavus, which can either infect the larva or the stored immobilised bees and this normally causes the larva to die. Female beewolves protect their offspring against pathogens, and they have evolved strategies to reduce the mortality of their offspring in the brood cell. The first strategy is to apply copious amounts of an anti-condensation secretion from a cephalic gland onto the paralysed bees to reduce water condensation on those bees and thereby delay fungal germination. The second strategy consists of a concentrated release of nitric oxide from the beewolf egg itself once the brood cells are closed by the mother that sterilises the deposited bees by killing actively growing fungi. The third strategy is that the female wasp secretes a whitish substance from specialised glands in its antennae into the brood cell, this secretion contains symbiotic bacteria of the genus Streptomyces, which are ingested by the larva and before the larva pupates the bacteria are applied to the cocoon to protect the larva from fungal infection.

The males set up territories in vegetation near to the females' nesting aggregations, these territories do not hold any resources to interest the females. The territories are around a quarter of a square metre in extent and are marked with a pheromone from the male's cephalic glands. The males defend these territories from intruding males but the defence does not involve physical contact between the antagonists. Males may have territories which are often close to one another, constituting a form of lek, which allows the females to choose their mates from among the males. The males do not appear to attract the females by using any form of visual display and it is thought that the females choose the males to copulate with based on the quality of the pheromones the male produces. The amount of time the male occupies a territory is dependent on the number of female nests near that territory.

The adult wasps feed on nectar and have been recorded as feeding on nectar from bramble, sea-holly, Erica, thrift, pale toadflax Linaria repens, common ragwort, hemp-agrimony and creeping thistle.

== Nests ==
Niko Tinbergen made a series of carefully designed experiments demonstrating Philanthus identifies its nest by sight.

== Status in the UK ==
This wasp was previously considered to be one of the great aculeate rarities in Britain, with colonies only in sandy habitats on the Isle of Wight and Suffolk. It has undergone an expansion in range, with the wasp now locally common in a steadily increasing number of sites as far north as Yorkshire (2002). The species has RDB2 status (vulnerable) but, if revised, it is now likely that this status will be removed because of its increase in range and population.

== See also ==
- Philanthotoxin
