= Supernormal stimulus =

Concept in biology and psychology

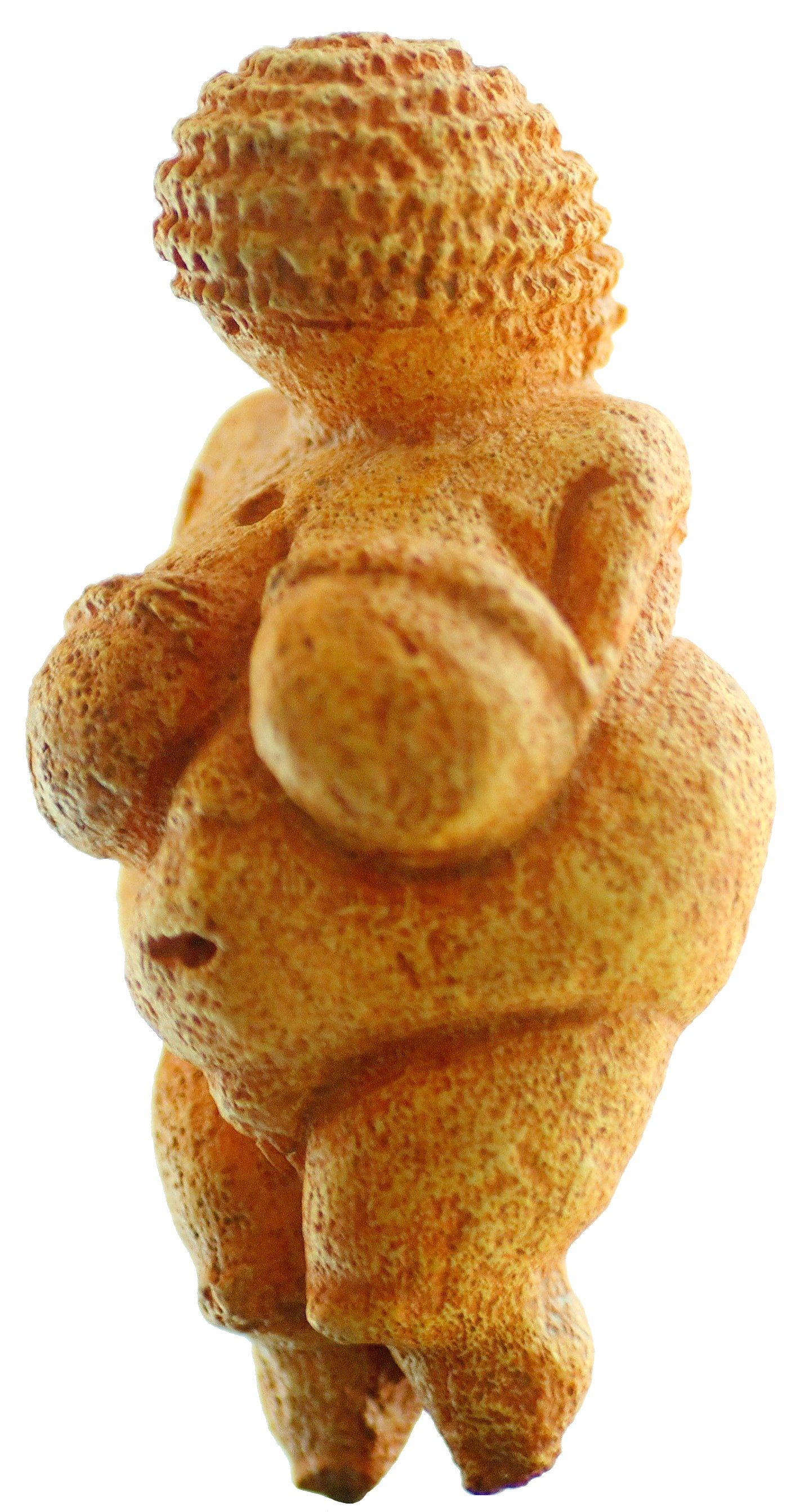
Venus of Willendorf, figurine exaggerating body and breast stimuli.

A supernormal stimulus or superstimulus is an exaggerated version of a stimulus to which there is an existing response tendency, or any stimulus that elicits a response more strongly than the stimulus for which it evolved.

For example, it is possible to create artificial bird eggs which certain birds will prefer over their own eggs, particularly evident in brood parasitism. Some speculate humans can be similarly exploited by junk food and pornography. Organisms tend to show a preference for the stimulus properties (e.g. size, colour, etc.) that have evolved in nature, but when offered an artificial exaggerated stimulus, animals will show behaviour in favour of the artificial stimulus over the naturally occurring stimulus. A variety of organisms display or are susceptible to supernormal stimuli, including insects, birds, and humans.

Supernormal stimuli are present in areas of biology and psychology, but are also studied within other fields like sociology and art.

British academic Nigel Spivey demonstrates the effect in the first episode of the 2005 BBC documentary series How Art Made the World to illustrate neuroscientist Vilayanur S. Ramachandran's speculation that this might be the reason for the exaggerated body image demonstrated in works of art from the Venus of Willendorf right up to the present day.

== Causation ==
Animals exhibiting, or responding to, characteristics that represent a supernormal stimulus usually display them as a result of selective pressures. Co-evolution between animals displaying supernormal stimuli, and the organisms responding to the supernormal stimuli, rely on evolution and propagation of genetics, behavioral patterns, and other biological factors. Supernormal stimuli such as emphasized color, size, patterns, or shapes, are often successful because an organism that exhibits them will often be selected by an organism that favors it. This will ensure survival and increased reproductive fitness of current and later generations.

== In biology ==
In the 1950s, Konrad Lorenz observed that birds would select brooding eggs that resembled those of their own species but which were larger. Niko Tinbergen, coined this term through his research, which discovered that experimenters could display an alternate target that attract an organism's attention more so than the naturally occurring target. Tinbergen studied herring gulls, and found the chicks peck at the red spot located on their parent's bill. The offspring targets the red spot due to the contrast of color (stimulus). They do this in order to receive food through regurgitation from the parent. Tinbergen and colleagues developed an experiment that presented different models to chicks and determined their pecking rates. They used different models including an adult herring gull's natural head, a standard wooden model of its head, the bill only, and a red stick with smaller white markings on it. The pecking rate of the chicks were consistent with the natural head, standard head model, and the bill only model. The pecking rate of the chicks increased when presented with the stick model. This suggests that the chicks preferred the dramatic contrast of the red stick with the yellow markings, therefore the artificial stimulus of the stick model was favored over the basic herring gull head and bill models, proving that the artificial stimuli was favored over the naturally occurring stimuli. Following his extensive analysis of the stimulus features that elicited food-begging in the chick of the herring gull, he constructed an artificial stimulus consisting of a red knitting needle with three white bands painted around it; this elicited a stronger response than an accurate three-dimensional model of the parent's head (white) and bill (yellow with a red spot).

Tinbergen and his students studied other variations of this effect. He experimented with dummy plaster eggs of various sizes and markings finding that most birds preferred ones with more exaggerated markings than their own, more saturated versions of their color, and a larger size than their own. Small songbirds which laid light blue grey-dappled eggs preferred to sit on a bright blue black polka-dotted dummy so large they slid off repeatedly. Territorial male stickleback fish would attack wooden floats with red undersides—attacking them more vigorously than invading male sticklebacks if the underside were redder.

Lorenz and Tinbergen accounted for the supernormal stimulus effect in terms of the concept of the innate releasing mechanism; however this concept is no longer widely used. The core observation that simple features of stimuli may be sufficient to trigger a complex response remains valid, however.

In 1979, the term supernormal stimulus was used by Richard Dawkins and John Krebs to refer to the exaggeration of pre-existing signs induced by social parasites, noting the manipulation of baby birds (hosts) from these, to illustrate the effectiveness of those signals.

In 1983, entomologists Darryl Gwynne and David Rentz reported on the beetle Julodimorpha bakewelli attempting to copulate with discarded brown stubbies (a type of beer bottles) studded with tubercules (flattened glass beads). This work won them the 2011 Ig Nobel Prize in biology.

Another example of this is the study made by Mauck and colleagues, where they evaluated the effects of a plant pathogen named cucumber mosaic virus or CMV. This study showed that the aphids preferred the healthy plants but are still attracted by the infected plants, because of the manipulation of volatile compounds used by plants to attract them.

=== Insects ===
Pollinators, like butterflies, show behavioral response(s) to supernormal stimuli through intersexual communication. Butterflies use olfactory cues, but primarily rely on visual forms of communication, due to wind and temperature affecting their sense of smell. Sexually active butterflies will perch and wait for a mate. Once an object is detected, the butterfly can determine if the color and movement patterns are of a sexually receptive butterfly. In certain species, like the silver-washed fritillary butterfly (Argynnis paphia), the male butterfly will exhibit high contrast sensitivity and well-developed visual acuity. A more dramatic contrast of color (or movement pattern) resembling, but further emphasizing the traits of the female butterfly, could alter this usual behavior in males. Studies show that the male silver-washed fritillary butterfly select a monochromatic orange paper model, over receptive female butterflies who portrayed their usual coloration/markings.

=== Manipulation by parasites ===
In 2001, Holen et al., analyzed the evolutionary stability of hosts manipulation through exaggerated signals. Their model indicated that intensity of parasitic signals must be below a threshold to ensure acceptance from host. This threshold depends directly on the range of parasitism.

Supernormal stimuli can be exhibited by brood parasites, for example, the parasitic cuckoo chick and parental care by reed warblers. Brood parasites have evolved more dramatic colors, sizes, patterns, and/or shapes that lead to the parasite being interpreted as healthier or more preferable, in contrast to neighboring offspring. Cuckoo chicks are often successful because their begging calls, the supernormal stimulus, are representative of an entire reed warbler brood. Due to the host parent's evolutionary instinct, elicited by selective pressures, they will select this exaggerated form of the stimulus. These calls will cause the host parent to primarily invest energy into the parasitic chick and provide it with additional food resources. Studies show that the supernormal stimuli in cuckoo chicks alter the foraging behavior in parental reed warblers.

For them, the only evolutionary stable strategy is when the host accepts all signs of the parasite with optimal intensity, which must be below the threshold; if this is not the case, the host can use these signals to identify the parasite.

==== Maladaptive behavior ====
Maladaptive behaviors are shown by organisms that display a preference for supernormal stimuli over naturally occurring stimuli. This is often based on instinct to gather as many resources as possible in a resource-sparse environment. It can also be instinctual for certain species to select the supernormal stimuli that will suggest the best energy investment of the individual, often parental investment. The selection of the supernormal stimuli must also simultaneously outweigh the cost of the behavior in order for it to evolve. This is shown in the cuckoo chick and the effects on host reed warblers. These parasitic chicks exhibit irresistible begging calls toward the parental host. This occurs as a result of selective pressures. The reed warbler increases foraging efforts to feed the parasitic chick and its own offspring. As a result, this shows a maladaptive behaviour of the host reed warbler as it is investing into a chick that is not biologically related, which does not provide reproductive fitness gain.

==== Biodiversity concerns ====
The significance of supernormal stimuli and brood parasitism or in various other species susceptible to environmental manipulation, is that this can drastically reduce the population numbers of the respective species. Brood parasitism can cause host parents to ignore their own offspring or display a higher parental investment into the parasite. Animals that are at risk of extinction, extirpation, or vulnerability will be impacted by supernormal stimuli present in brood parasites.

== In psychology ==
Harvard psychologist Deirdre Barrett argues that supernormal stimulation governs the behavior of humans as powerfully as that of other animals. In her 2010 book, Supernormal Stimuli: How Primal Urges Overran Their Evolutionary Purpose, she examines the impact of supernormal stimuli on the diversion of impulses for nurturing, sexuality, romance, territoriality, defense, and the entertainment industry's hijacking of our social instincts. In her earlier book Waistland, she explains junk food as an exaggerated stimulus to cravings for salt, sugar, and fats and television as an exaggeration of social cues of laughter, smiling faces and attention-grabbing action. Modern artifacts may activate instinctive responses which evolved prior to the modern world, where breast development was a sign of health and fertility in a prospective mate, and fat was a rare and vital nutrient.

In a cross-cultural study, Doyle and Pazhoohi showed that surgically augmented breasts are supernormal stimuli, and they are more attractive than natural breasts, regardless of their size. Also in a theoretical paper, Doyle proposed that how women walk creates supernormal stimuli through continuously alternating motion of the waist and hips causing peak shifts in perceptions of physical attractiveness involving women's waist-to-hip ratio. Furthermore, Pazhoohi et al. (2019) using eye tracking confirmed that lower than optimal waist-to-hip ratios are supernormal stimuli and they may generate peak shifts in responding.

Pascal Boyer has suggested that music is a superstimulus targeting human affinity for speech, and that symmetrical textile and building patterns are superstimuli targeted to the visual cortex.

== In art ==
Costa and Corazza (2006), examining 776 artistic portraits covering the whole history of art, showed that eye roundness, lip roundness, eye height, eye width, and lip height were significantly enhanced in artistic portraits compared to photographic ones matched for sex and age. In a second study, forty-two art academy students were requested to draw two self-portraits, one with a mirror and one without (from memory). Eye and lip size and roundness were greater in artistic self-portraits. These results show that the exaggeration and "supernormalization" of key features linked to attractiveness, such as eye and lip size, are frequently found in art. Pazhoohi et al. (2019) showed that classic contrapposto pose is considered more attractive and provided evidence and insight as to why, in artistic presentation, goddesses of beauty and love are often depicted in contrapposto pose.

== See also ==
- Hyperreality, a similar concept in semiotics
- Peak shift principle
