= How Art Made the World =

2005 BBC documentary television series

- Genre: Documentary
- Presented by: Nigel Spivey
- Country of origin: United Kingdom
- Original language: English
- No. of series: 1
- No. of episodes: 5

Production
- Executive producer: Kim Thomas
- Producer: Mark Hedgecoe
- Running time: 60 minutes

Original release
- Network: BBC One
- Release: 26 June – 24 July 2005

How Art Made the World is a 2005 five-part BBC One documentary series, with each episode looking at the influence of art on the current day situation of our society.

"The essential premise of the show," according to Nigel Spivey, "is that of all the defining characteristics of humanity as a species, none is more basic than the inclination to make art. Great apes will smear paint on canvas if they are given brushes and shown how, but they do not instinctively produce art any more than parrots produce conversation. We humans are alone in developing the capacity for symbolic imagery."

== Episodes ==
Images dominate our lives. They tell us how to behave, even how to feel. They mould and define us. But why do these images, the pictures, symbols and the art we see around us every day, have such a powerful hold on us? The answer lies not here in our time but thousands of years ago. Because when our ancient ancestors first created the images that made sense of their world, they produced a visual legacy which has helped to shape our own.

In this series we'll be travelling around the globe, discovering the world's most stunning treasures. We'll see how the struggles of early artists led to the triumphs of the world's great civilisations. Our journey will take us through a hundred thousand years of history. We'll be witnessing some of the extraordinary ceremonies of the world's oldest artistic cultures. And we'll reveal how they unlock the deepest secrets of ancient art, We'll be hearing from the people who made these discoveries. And we'll be using science to uncover how thousands of years ago the human mind drove us to create astonishing images, You'll never look at our world the same way again, for this is the epic story of how we humans made art and how art made us human.

— Nigel Spivey's opening narration

=== Episode one: More Human Than Human... ===
The first episode asks why humans surround themselves with images of the body that are so unrealistic.

The fact is people rarely create images of the body that are realistic. What's going on? Why is our world so dominated by images of the body that are so unrealistic?

— Nigel Spivey's opening narration

Dr. Spive begins his investigation by travelling to Willendorf, where in 1908 three Austrian archaeologists discovered the Venus of Willendorf, an 11 cm (4.3 in) high statuette of a female figure, estimated to have been made between 24,000 and 22,000 BCE. Spivey travels to the Naturhistorisches Museum in Vienna to examine the Venus's grotesquely exaggerated breasts and abdomen, as well as its lack of arms and face, which shows the desire to exaggerate dates back to the very first images of the human body created by our ancestors. Spivey speculates that, The people who made this statue lived in a harsh ice-age environment where features of fatness and fertility would have been highly desirable, and several similar statuettes collectively referred to as Venus figurines show that this exaggerated body image continued for millennia.

Neuroscientist Vilayanur S. Ramachandran speculates that the reason for this lies in a neurological principle known as the supernormal stimulus, which Spivey demonstrates by replicating Nikolaas Tinbergen's experiment with Herring gull chicks. When the chicks are shown a yellow stick with a single red line made to represent their mother's beak, they tap on it as they are programmed to do to demand food. However, when they are presented with a stick with three red lines they tap on it with increased enthusiasm even in comparison to the original beak. Ramachandran concludes, "I think there's an analogy here in that what's going on in the brains of our ancestors, the artists who were creating these Venus figurines were producing grossly exaggerated versions, the equivalent for their brain of what the stick with the three red stripes is for the chick's brain."

Spivey next travels to Egypt to discover if the gross exaggerations of hard-wired herring gull instincts of the nomadic artisans survived into the era of civilization. The Egyptian images of the human body, which he discovers at the Tomb of Pharaoh Rameses VI and the Karnak Temple Complex, were regular and repeated, and nothing about them was exaggerated. Mapped onto the wall at the unfinished Tomb of Amenhotep III's vizier Ramose he discovers the grid which dictated the precise proportions and composition of these images for three thousand years. The Egyptians created images of the body this way, Spivy concludes, not because of how their brains were hard-wired but because of their culture.

Spivey finally travels to Italy, where Stefano Mariottini relates his extraordinary discovery off the coast of Riace, near Reggio Calabria. As revealed in an antique copy of Herodotus in St John's College Old Library, Greek sculptors learned the Egyptians' techniques and initially created truly realistic depictions of the human body, like Kritian Boy at the Acropolis Museum in Athens, Greece. However, according to Ramachandran, the problem with the Kritian Boy is it was too realistic, that makes it boring, and the style was soon abandoned. Spivey states that, the Greeks discovered they had to do interesting things with the human form, such as distorting it in lawful ways, and examines the pioneering work of a sculptor and mathematician called Polyclitus, as exemplified in the Riace bronzes at the Museo Nazionale della Magna Grecia. Spivey concludes that the first civilisation capable of realism had used exaggeration to go further, and it's that instinct which still dominates our world today.

This is the answer to our mystery. This is why the bodies in our modern world look the way they do. The reality is we humans don't like reality. The shared biological instinct to prefer carefully exaggerated images links us inexorably with our ancient ancestors, and yet what we choose to exaggerate is where science gets left behind. That's where the magic comes in.

— Nigel Spivey's closing narration

==== Crew ====
- Photography: Chris Hartley
- Underwater Photography: Rob Franklin
- Film Editor: Peter Norrey
- Produced & Directed by: Nick Murphy

==== Consultants ====
- Script consultant: Frank Ash
- Archaeological consultant: David Barrowclough

=== Episode two: The Day Pictures Were Born ===
The second episode asks how the very first pictures ever made were created and reveals how images may have triggered the greatest change in human history.

I could draw almost anything in the world and you'd probably guess what it was, But there must have been some point in our human story when we first got this ability, some moment in time when we began to create pictures and to understand what they meant. So what happened back then? How did we first get this ability to create images? To find the answer, we need to go way back in time.

— Nigel Spivey's opening narration

Dr. Spivey begins his investigation by travelling to the Cave of Altamira near the town of Santillana del Mar in Cantabria, Spain, where in 1879 a young girl's exclamation of Papa. Look, oxen. to her father, local amateur archeologist Marcelino Sanz de Sautuola, is explained to have meant that Maria had just become the first modern human to set eyes on the first gallery of prehistoric paintings ever to be discovered. The find revealed that, About 35,000 years ago, we began to create pictures and to understand what they meant. French priest Henri Breuil believed that, prehistoric artists painted animals to increase their chances of a successful hunt, but the animals painted here and at other sites such as the Pech Merle in France, also visited by Spivey, did not match the bones discovered and abstract patterns revealed the artists weren't merely copying from real life.

Spivey next travels to the Drakensberg Mountains of South Africa, where rock painting made 200 years ago by the San people and similarly dismissed as hunting scenes, are revealed by anthropologist David Lewis-Williams to contain many of the same unusual features. 19th century interviews with the San by German linguist Wilhelm Bleek reveal the importance of trance within their culture, an observation confirmed by Spivey after watching a shamanistic ritual performed by their present-day descendants in a village near Tsumkwe, Namibia far from the mountains. Lewis-Williams theorises that, the paintings were not just pictures of everyday life, but they were about spiritual experiences in a trance state.

==== Crew ====
- Photography: David Baillie & Chris Hartley
- Film Editor: Paul Carlin
- Directed by: Robin Dashwood & Mark Hedgecoe

==== Consultants ====
- Script consultant: Frank Ash
- Archaeological consultant: David Barrowclough

== Media information ==
=== DVD release ===
Released on Region 2 DVD by BBC DVD on 30 May 2005.

=== Companion book ===
The 2005 companion book to the series was written by presenter Nigel Spivey.

==== Selected editions ====
- Spivey, Nigel (28 April 2005). How Art Made the World: A Journey to the Origins of Art. BBC Books (hardcover). ISBN 978-0563522058.
- Spivey, Nigel (8 November 2005). How Art Made the World: A Journey to the Origins of Art. Basic Books (hardcover). ISBN 978-0465081813.
- Spivey, Nigel (7 November 2006). How Art Made the World: A Journey to the Origins of Art. Basic Books (paperback). ISBN 978-0465081820.
