= Joost Tinbergen =

Dutch ecologist

Joost Marius Tinbergen (born 1950 in Groningen) is a Dutch ecologist.

Tinbergen is the son of the ornithologist Luuk Tinbergen, and nephew of Nobel Prize–winning brothers Jan and Niko Tinbergen. His older brother is the film-maker Tijs Tinbergen.

Tinbergen gained his PhD from the University of Groningen in 1980. His thesis was 'Foraging decisions in Starlings'. He has been professor since 1994.
