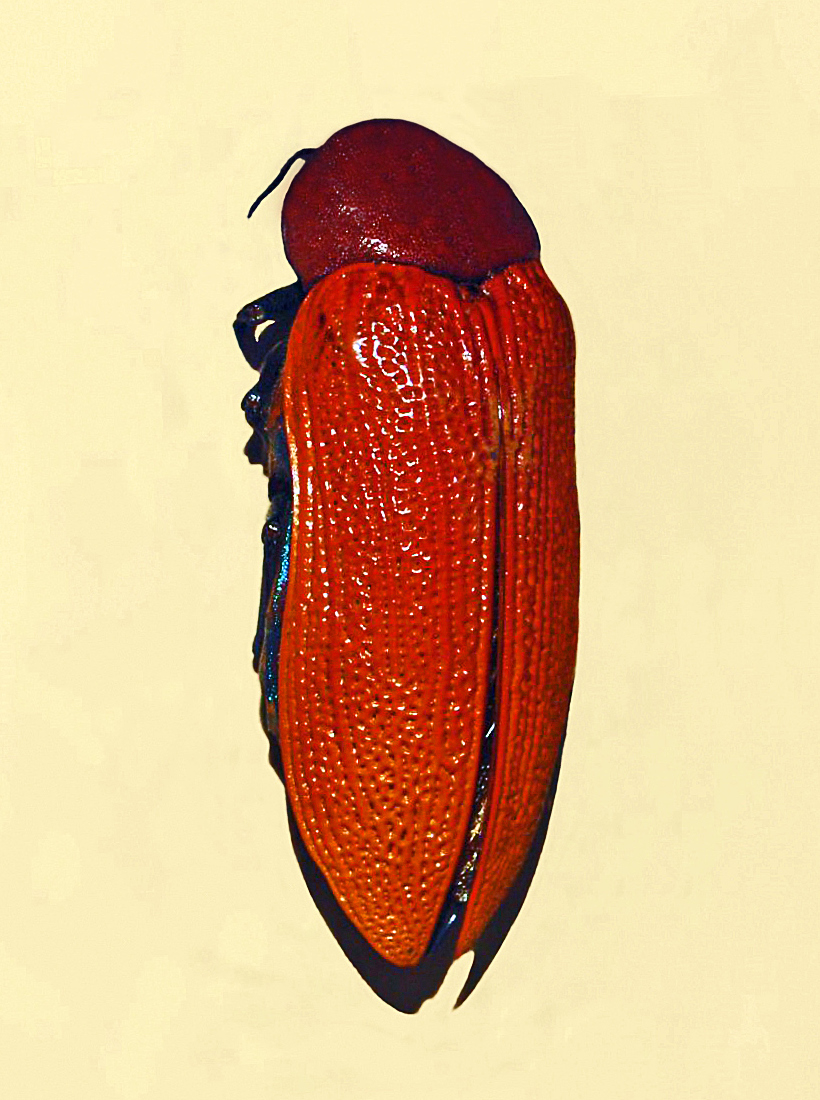
- Julodimorpha bakewelli from Australia

Scientific classification
- Kingdom: Animalia
- Phylum: Arthropoda
- Class: Insecta
- Order: Coleoptera
- Suborder: Polyphaga
- Infraorder: Elateriformia
- Family: Buprestidae
- Genus: Julodimorpha; Gemminger & Harold, 1869

= Julodimorpha =

Genus of beetles

Julodimorpha is a genus of beetles in the family Buprestidae.

== Species ==
Julodimorpha contains the following species:

- Julodimorpha bakewelli (White, 1859)
- Julodimorpha saundersii Thomson, 1878

== Observations on mating behaviour ==
In 1983, entomologists Darryl Gwynne and David Rentz reported on male Julodimorpha saundersii (confused at that time with the closely related J. bakewelli), which were observed attempting to copulate with discarded brown stubbies (a type of beer bottles) studded with tubercules (bobbly bits). The beetles' behavior was an example of a supernormal stimulus. The report won Gwynne and Rentz the 2011 Ig Nobel Prize in biology.
