= Pregnant man =

Pregnant man or The Pregnant Man may refer to:

- Pregnancy in human males, possible with transgender and intersex men and discussed hypothetically regarding cisgender men
  - Transgender pregnancy
  - Mpreg, a term used in fanfiction
- Thomas Beatie, public speaker known as "The Pregnant Man"
- The Pregnant Man and Other Cases from a Hypnotherapist's Couch, a 2010 book

== See also ==
- Couvade syndrome, also called sympathetic pregnancy
- Fatherhood
- Pregnant (disambiguation)
