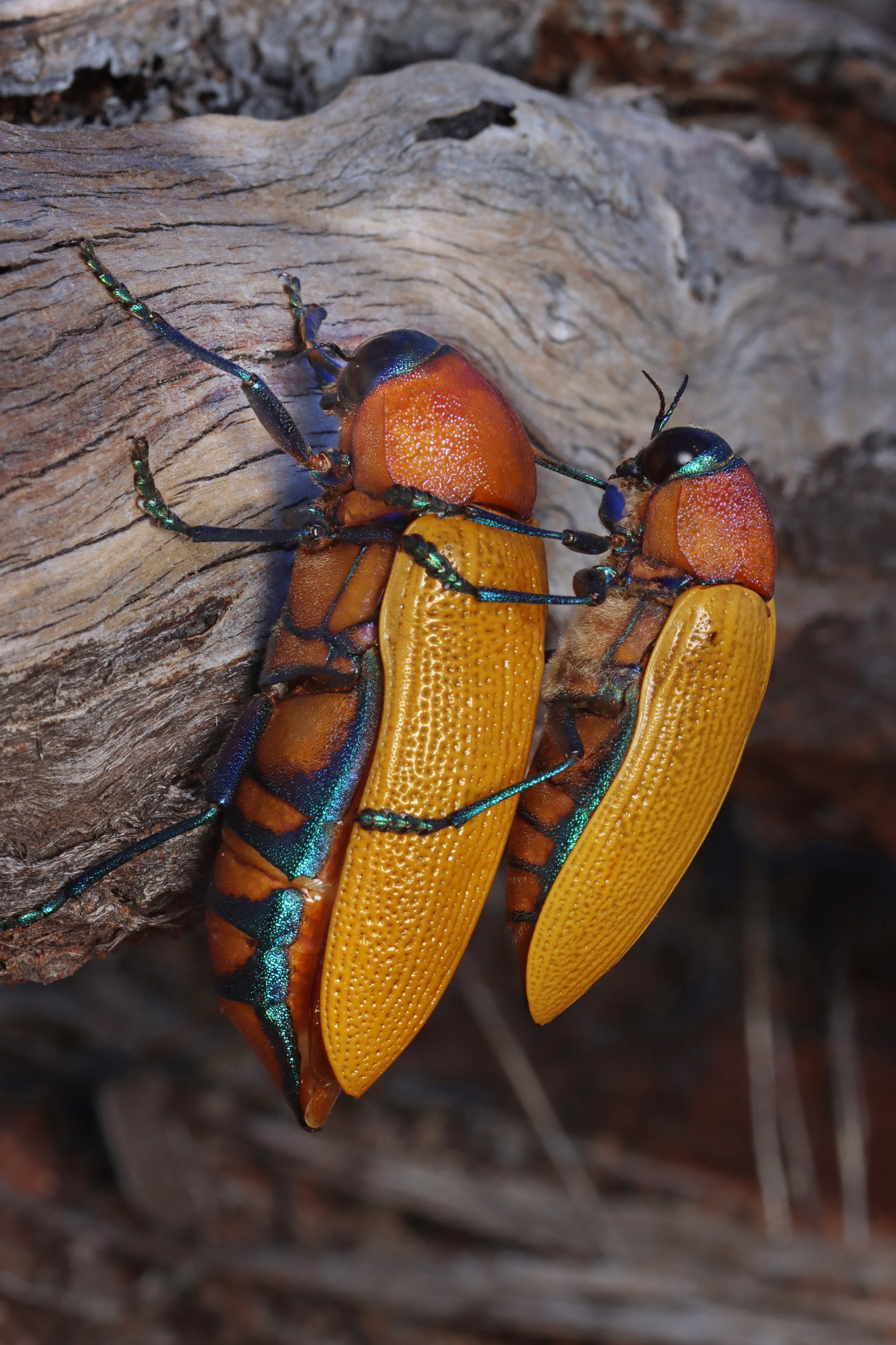
- In Australia

Scientific classification
- Kingdom: Animalia
- Phylum: Arthropoda
- Clade: Pancrustacea
- Class: Insecta
- Order: Coleoptera
- Suborder: Polyphaga
- Infraorder: Elateriformia
- Family: Buprestidae
- Genus: Julodimorpha
- Species: J. bakewelli

Binomial name
- Julodimorpha bakewelli (White, 1859)

Synonyms
- Stigmodera bakewellii (White, 1859)

= Julodimorpha bakewelli =

Species of beetle

Julodimorpha bakewelli is a species of beetle in the family Buprestidae. It was first described by Adam White in 1859.

== Description ==
Julodimorpha bakewelli can reach a length of over 40 millimetres (1.6 in). These large brown buprestids have an elongate and almost cylindrical body. The head is almost hidden when the beetle is viewed from above. The pronotum is dark brown and quite wide at the base. The elytra are brown, wider than the pronotum and densely striatopunctated.

Adults are diurnal and herbivore. They are reported to breed in roots and trunks of Eucalyptus species (Myrtaceae). Larvae are root-feeder. Both larvae and adults are present on flowers of Acacia calamifolia (Mimosaceae).

== Observations on mating behaviour ==
The males of this species have the habit to aggregate on and attempting to copulate with discarded brown "stubbies" (a type of beer bottle). The males are attracted by the refraction of light produced by the glass bumps of the bottles, resembling giant females with a very similar colour and surface. Due to this erroneous mating behaviour, this species is threatened as the high rates of unsuccessful reproduction results in lower survival rates, and males will persist with their attempts to mate with the inanimate objects until they are rendered victim to environmental threats such as sun intensity and foraging Iridomyrmex discors. Prof. Darryl Gwynne, from the University of Toronto, and David Rentz were awarded an Ig Nobel Prize for their studies on this Julodimorpha species behaviour. This behaviour is often given as an example of a supernormal stimulus.

== Distribution ==
This species can be found in the arid and semi- arid areas of Queensland, New South Wales, South Australia, Victoria and Western Australia.
