= Waistland =

2007 book by Deirdre Barrett

- Author: Deirdre Barrett
- Language: English
- Publisher: W. W. Norton & Company
- Publication date: 2007
- Publication place: United States
- Pages: 320
- ISBN: 978-0393062168

Waistland: The R/evolutionary Science Behind Our Weight and Fitness Crisis is a book by Harvard psychologist Deirdre Barrett published by W. W. Norton & Company in 2007. The book examines the obesity and fitness crisis from an evolutionary standpoint. Barrett argues that our bodies, our metabolisms, and our feeding instincts evolved during humanity’s hunter-gatherer phase. We're programmed to forage for sugar and saturated fats because these were once found only in hard-to-come-by fruit and game. Now, these same foods are everywhere—in vending machines, fast food joint, restaurants, grocery stores, and school cafeterias—they're nearly impossible to avoid. She describes this as related to the focus of another of her books " supernormal stimuli"—the concept of artificial creations that appeal more to our instincts than the natural objects they mimic—supernormal stimuli for appetite have led to the obesity epidemic. The book opens with a vignette about how zoos post signs saying "Don't Feed the Animals." People respect these orders, allowing veterinarians to prescribe just the right balanced diet for the lions, koalas, and snakes. Meanwhile, everyone stops for chips, sodas, and hot dogs on the way out of the zoo. The book explores solutions from behavior modification to willpower to change diet and exercise habits. One of the main messages of the book is that big changes in diet are actually easier than small ones, that the addictive nature of junk food means that, after a few days, eating no cookies or chips is easier than eating fewer cookies or chips.

== Reviews ==
"An elegantly written and eye-opening analysis of what makes us fat." - Steven Pinker

"At the start of this sensible book about the "weight and fitness crisis" in America, Harvard psychologist Deirdre Barrett says the answer lies in the study of evolution. As animals, we are genetically almost identical to our Stone Age ancestors. We live in advanced societies, with supermarkets and cars and lifts, but we are built to be hunter-gatherers. We are programmed to seek out fat, sugar, starch and salt, because, in the Stone Age, these things were hard to come by. When they turn up in abundance, our bodies, for the most part, can't say no. . . . to put it simply, human beings are evolving much more slowly than the food we eat. And the food is tricking us. We think it's what we need, but it's just what we want. What can we do? Eat sensibly and exercise, of course. One thing we have to do, though, is not to "listen to your body" – because it craves food that, in abundance, is bad for it. . . This is a clear, well-written and thoughtful guide to the fat crisis." - The Telegraph (UK)

"In a new book, Waistland, Deirdre Barrett points out that KFC or McDonald's would be happy to sell us tofu burgers and carrot strips, but our inner hunter-gatherer wants fat, and sugar, and salt - cravings that made sense for almost all of human existence, just accepting those past few thousand years. And we would all be in great shape, she argues, if we could just replicate the hunter-gatherer lifestyle." - Talk of the Nation : NPR
