= The Committee of Sleep =

Book by Deirdre Barrett

- Author: Deirdre Barrett
- Language: English
- Publisher: Crown/Random House
- Publication date: 2001
- Publication place: United States
- Pages: 224
- ISBN: 978-0812932416

The Committee of Sleep: How Artists, Scientists, and Athletes Use Dreams for Creative Problem-Solving—and How You Can Too is a book by Deirdre Barrett published by Crown/Random House in 2001. Barrett is a psychologist on the faculty of Harvard Medical School. The book describes how dreams have contributed practical breakthroughs to arts and sciences in the waking world. Chapters are organized by discipline: art, literature, science, sports, medicine, etc. There are long examples of dreams which led to major achievements in each area, but Barrett then draws conclusions about how dreams go about solving problems, what types they are best at, and gives advice on how readers can apply these techniques to their own endeavors. Those who are described in The Committee of Sleep as having dreamed creations include Ludwig van Beethoven, Billy Joel, Robert Louis Stevenson, Stephen King, Salvador Dalí, William Blake, and Nobel Prize winner Otto Loewi.

== Contents ==
Introduction

1. In the Gallery of the Night

2. Dreams That Money Can Buy: Filmmaking and Theater

3. The Stately Pleasure Dome of Dream Literature

4. The Devil Plays the Violin: Dreams and Music

5. The Committee of Sleep Wins a Nobel Prize: Dreams in Science and Math

6. Of Sewing Machines and Other Dreams: Inventions of The Committee

7. The Claw of the Panther: Dreams and the Body

8. When Gandhi Dreamed of Resistance: Variations in Non-western Cultures

9. What Word Starts and Ends With “He”? Sleep on a Brainteaser and Wake Up with a Headache

Conclusion

== Reviews ==
The book was reviewed by Oliver Sacks, USA Today, The New Yorker, and Publishers Weekly.
