= Pandemic Dreams =

2020 book by Deirdre Barrett

- Author: Deirdre Barrett
- Cover artist: Deirdre Barrett
- Language: English
- Publication date: 2020
- Publication place: United States
- Pages: 86
- ISBN: 978-0982869536

Pandemic Dreams is a book by Deirdre Barrett, a psychologist on the faculty of Harvard Medical School. It was published by Oneiroi Press in 2020.

The book is based on Barrett’s survey of more than 9,000 dreams from over 3,700 dreamers, all around the world. It discusses why dreams have become more vivid since the pandemic began, and explores different forms the crisis is taking in dreams—characterizing major themes in these dreams and what they symbolize. It explains practical exercises for dream interpretation, reduction of nightmares, and incubation of helpful, problem-solving dreams.

The book is divided into five chapters that address different aspects of pandemic dreams. Each ends with a practical exercise to use with that category of dream.
