= Tijs Tinbergen =

Dutch filmmaker (born c. 1947)

Tijs Tinbergen (Dutch pronunciation: [tɛis ˈtɪmbɛrɣə(n)]; born c. 3 July 1947 in Hulshorst) is a Dutch filmmaker.

Tinbergen graduated with honors from the Netherlands Film Academy in 1975. He primarily produces documentaries, usually in collaboration with the producer Jan Musch. In 2009, he won the Golden Calf award for his film Rotvos.

Tinbergen is the son of Tilde Frensdorf (1922–2014) and the ornithologist Luuk Tinbergen (1915–1955). He is the nephew of the Nobel Prize-winning brothers Jan and Niko Tinbergen.
