= Pregnant (disambiguation) =

A woman is pregnant during pregnancy.

Pregnant may also refer to:

- Pregnant (band)
- "Pregnant" (Louie)
- "Pregnant" (My Hero)
- "Pregnant" (Not Going Out)

== See also ==
- Pregnant men
