= Philanthotoxin =

PhTX-433

Names
- IUPAC name N-[(2S)-1-[4-[3-(3-Aminopropylamino)propylamino]butylamino]-3-(4-hydroxyphenyl)-1-oxopropan-2-yl]butanamide

Identifiers
CAS Number	115976-91-5
3D model (JSmol)	Interactive image
ChEMBL	ChEMBL1160514
ChemSpider	103077
PubChem CID	115201
CompTox Dashboard (EPA)	DTXSID80896963
- InChI: InChI=1S/C23H41N5O3/c1-2-7-22(30)28-21(18-19-8-10-20(29)11-9-19)23(31)27-17-4-3-13-25-15-6-16-26-14-5-12-24/h8-11,21,25-26,29H,2-7,12-18,24H2,1H3,(H,27,31)(H,28,30)/t21-/m0/s1 Key: VRQNABCCOFCGJL-NRFANRHFSA-N; InChI=1/C23H41N5O3/c1-2-7-22(30)28-21(18-19-8-10-20(29)11-9-19)23(31)27-17-4-3-13-25-15-6-16-26-14-5-12-24/h8-11,21,25-26,29H,2-7,12-18,24H2,1H3,(H,27,31)(H,28,30)/t21-/m0/s1 Key: VRQNABCCOFCGJL-NRFANRHFBQ
- SMILES: CCCC(=O)N[C@@H](Cc1ccc(cc1)O)C(=O)NCCCCNCCCNCCCN

Properties
Chemical formula	C_{23}H_{41}N_{5}O_{3}
Molar mass	435.603 g/mol
- Except where otherwise noted, data are given for materials in their standard state (at 25 °C [77 °F], 100 kPa). verify (what is ?) Infobox references

Philanthotoxins are components of the venom of the Egyptian solitary wasp Philanthus triangulum, commonly known as the European beewolf. Philanthotoxins are polyamine toxins, a group of toxins isolated from the venom of wasps and spiders which immediately but reversibly paralyze their prey. δ-philanthotoxin, also known as PhTX-433, is the most active philanthotoxin that can be refined from the venom. PhTX-433 functions by non-selectively blocking excitatory neurotransmitter ion channels, including nicotinic acetylcholine receptors (nAChRs) and ionotropic glutamate receptors (iGluRs). Synthetic analogues, including PhTX-343 and PhTX-12, have been developed to improve selectivity. While the IC_{50} values of philanthotoxins varies between analogues and receptor subunit composition, the IC_{50} value of PhTX-433 at the iGluR AMPA receptor naturally expressed in locust leg muscle is 18 μM and the IC_{50} value at rat nAChRs is 1 μM.

== Biological context ==
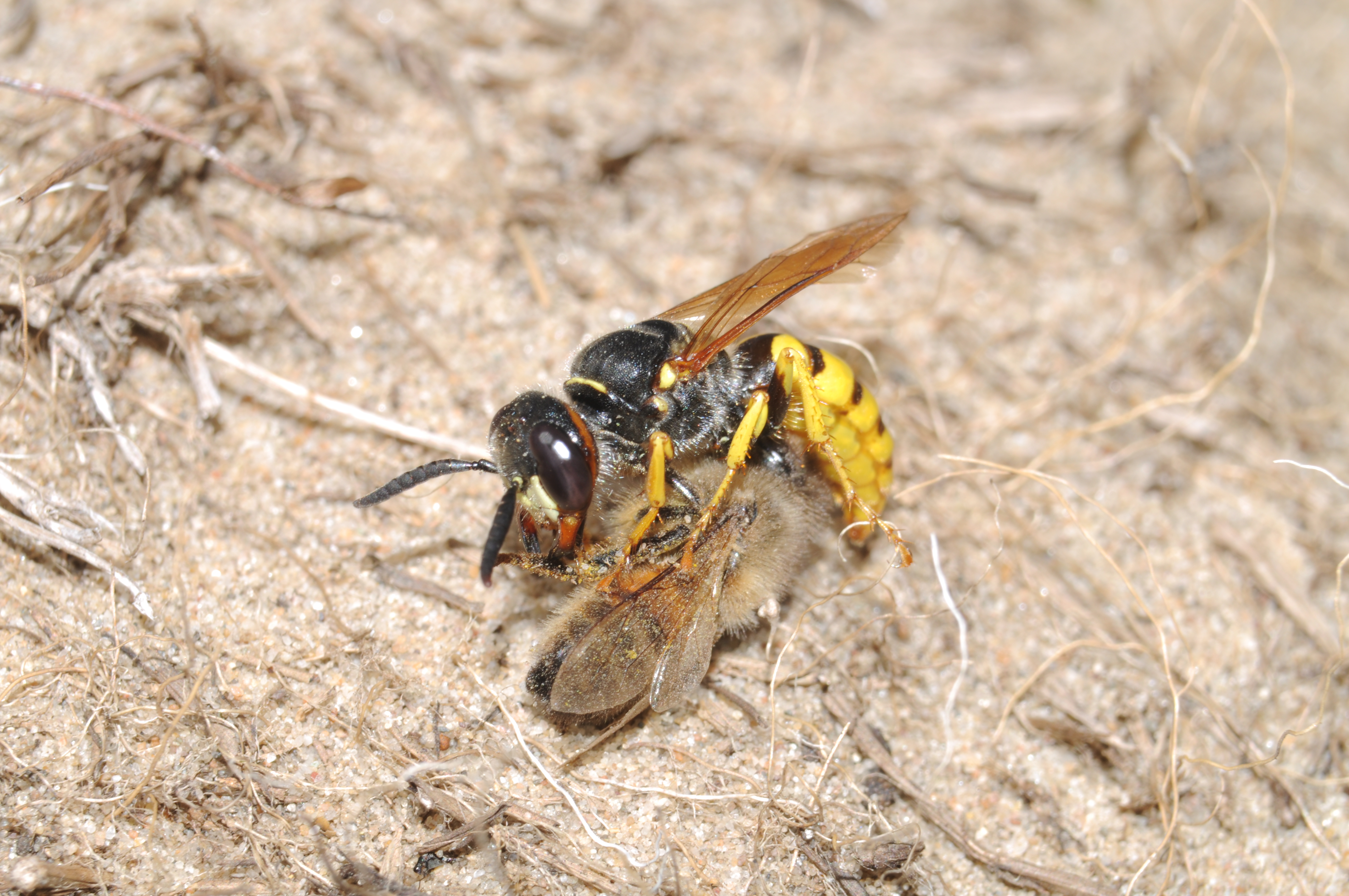
European beewolf female with paralyzed prey intended for her offspring

Nesting female Philanthus triangulum wasps utilize philanthotoxin-containing venom to paralyze prey (generally working honey bees Apis mellifera though other species may be collected) by stinging directly behind the front legs through the articular membranes. The female then carries the paralyzed prey to her nest burrow to be fed to her brood. The ability of the philanthotoxins in the venom to paralyze insect skeletal muscle through the blocking of glutamate receptor ion channels allows for this process to occur. Larval wasps rely on the paralyzed bees as a food source when they emerge. Paralyzed bee-prey may be stored for some length of time within the burrow and are regularly provisioned by the mother wasp to avoid spoiling due to fungal or bacterial infestation. In other predatory wasp species that paralyze instead of immediately killing the prey they provide their offspring, spoilage is deferred significantly by the chemical process of paralysis. Analysis of the provisioning of bee-prey by Beewolves, however, found that paralysis alone was not sufficient to prevent spoilage, and that additional preservation methods were associated with treatment by the female wasp.

== Mechanism of action ==
Philanthotoxins reversibly inhibit AMPA (also called the "quisqualate receptor"), kainate, and NMDA ionotropic glutamate receptors (iGluRs). Philanthotoxins have a hydrophobic aromatic head group and a hydrophilic polyamine tail, which allow them to inhibit iGluRs by binding within the ion channel. The nitrogen atoms of the polyamine tail have been proposed to interact with the negatively-charged or polar amino acids within the cation-selective channel pore. The aromatic head group anchors the molecule to the extracellular entrance to the channel. Inhibition may also occur via binding to an external allosteric polyamine binding site. Subunit composition of iGluRs heavily influences the efficacy of philanthotoxins. For example, AMPA receptors lacking the GluA2 subunit are highly sensitive to PhTX-433, whereas receptors containing the GluA2 subunit are predominantly insensitive. A study into the exact interactions that occur between the philanthotoxin molecules and the ion channels coupled with glutamate receptors has indicated that the molecules could bind to the narrowest region of the channel, thereby blocking ion flow, and that membrane potential is important to toxin-receptor interaction, making PhTXs highly voltage-dependent antagonists of iGluRs. PhTX-433 inhibits both vertebrate and insect nAChRs predominantly by non-competitively blocking the ion channel in its open conformation. Blockage or inhibition of excitatory ion-channel coupled receptors results in paralysis of skeletal muscle in the wasp's prey.

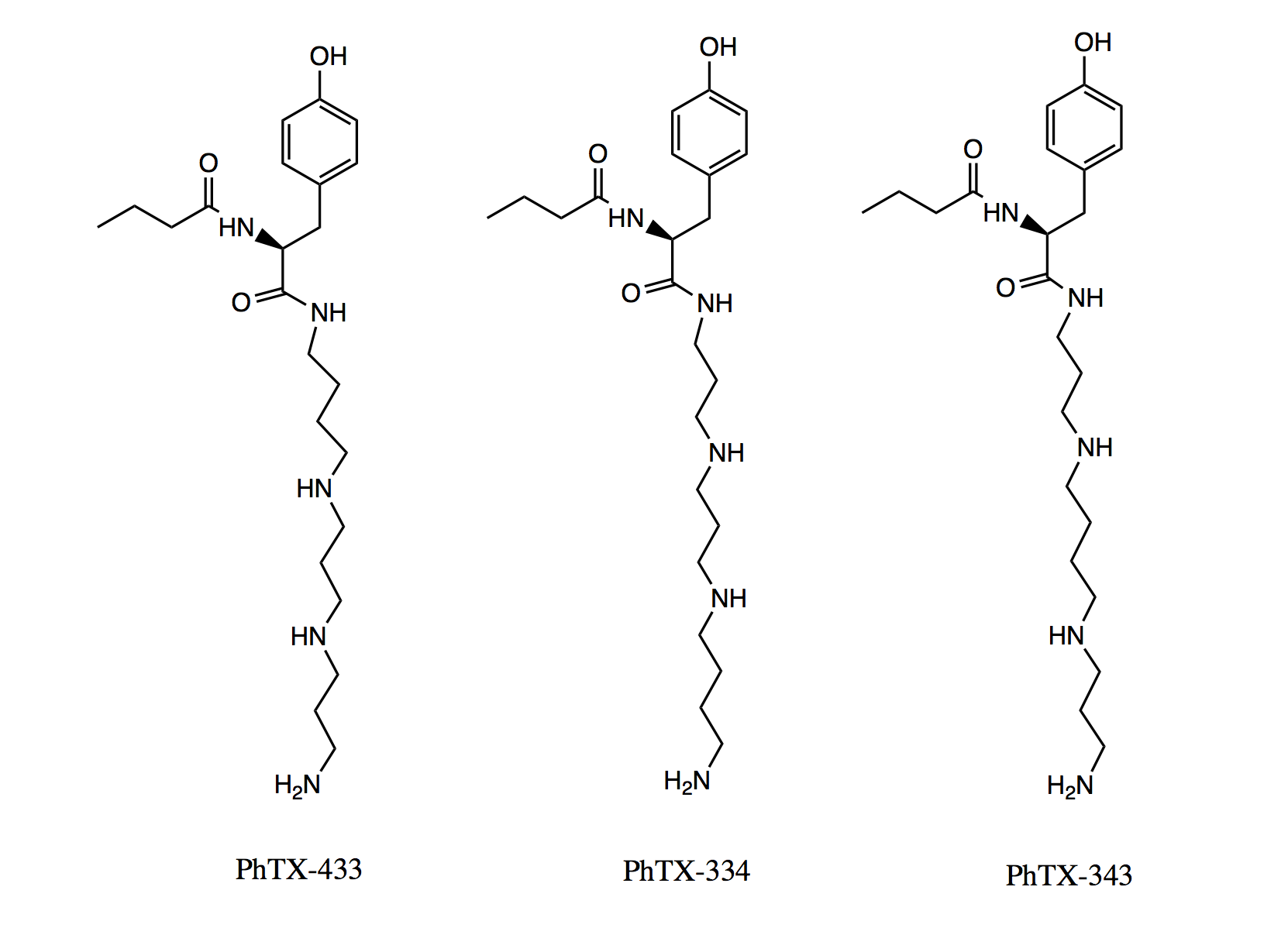
Philanthotoxin isomers generated during the identification of biological philanthotoxin structure. PhTX-433 was found to be identical to the biologically active form of the toxin isolated from the wasp's venom.

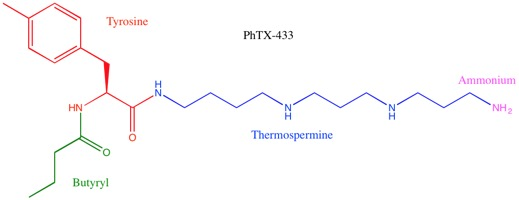
Philanthotoxins have four distinct regions that can be edited to produce a huge variety of synthetic analogs with varying efficacy and subunit selectivity. 4-3-3 describes number of methylenes separating nitrogens in the tail (thermospermine) region.

== Isolation and synthesis ==
PhTX-433 was structurally elucidated and synthesized in 1988 by Eldefrawi and colleagues. For the isolation and structural identification of PhTX-433 female wasp venom glands were fractionated using reverse-phase HPLC and fractions were tested for pharmacological activity. The most pharmacologically active sample was re-fractioned using the same method. UV spectrum and H^{1}NMR analysis revealed that the structure consisted of a butyrl/tyrosil/polyamine sequence. Three isomers, PhTX-433, PhTX-343, and PhTX-334 (see image at upper right of this section), were determined to be possible candidate structures and all three were synthesized. PhTX-433 was found to be identical to the natural product isolated from the fractionalization in terms of H^{1}NMR, mass spectrometry, HPLC, and biological activity. PhTX-433 was therefore designated as the structure of the most biologically active naturally occurring philanthotoxin. Because PhTX-433 lacks strong receptor subtype selectivity, a variety of analogs have been synthesized as candidates for potential pharmacological exploitation. Philanthotoxins have four distinct regions that can be modified (see image at lower right of this section); the number of nitrogens in the polyamine chain is the most common distinction between synthetic analogs. The most commonly synthesized and studied analogue is PhTX-343, which has similar properties to PhTX-433. Notably, philanthoxin and its synthetic analogues are smaller than similar polyamine toxins form orb-web spider venoms and argiotoxins, and are easier to synthesize.

== Historical context ==
Venoms from hymenoptera species have been used in Chinese, Korean, and ancient Greek and Egyptian traditional medical practices since 1000-3000 BCE to treat a variety of ailments, including various neurological disorders. Valued in part for their pharmacological usefulness, bees and wasps are heavily featured in the art and mythology of ancient Egypt, portrayed in hieroglyphs, amulets, and figurines.

== Modern uses ==
Study of ionotropic glutamate (iGlu; AMPA) and nACh receptors using philanthotoxins as tools has been ongoing since the 1980s. Analogues with IC_{50} values in the low nano-molar and pico-molar range have been identified and studied. Combined with the potential for precise receptor subtype selectivity, synthetic philanthotoxins could be used as highly potent and selective inhibitors for nAChRs and iGluRs. Glutamate is the main excitatory neurotransmitter in the mammalian brain and has been implicated in mediating neurological disorders and neurodegenerative diseases. There is considerable interest in the therapeutic development of iGluR antagonists as anticonvulsants, muscle relaxants, and agents to protect from ischemic brain damage and possibly neurodegeneration. Study of philanthotoxins has therefore been largely focused on their potent antagonistic effect on iGlu receptors in invertebrate and vertebrate nervous systems, as abnormal activation of these receptors is involved with Alzheimer's disease, stroke, epilepsy, neuropathic pain, Parkinson's disease, and schizophrenia. By blocking open ionotropic receptor channels, philanthotoxins can moderate excessive opening associated with pathological neurological conditions and prevent a potentially damaging influx of calcium (Ca^{2+}), resulting in neuroprotection. It is notable that this is a similar mechanism of action to the Alzheimer's drug Memantine, which has obtained good clinical results in the symptomatic treatment of Alzhiemer's disease. In addition, because nAChRs are the major excitatory neurotransmitter gated ion channels in insects, philanthotoxins may be developed as insecticides. The low specificity of the naturally occurring PhTX-433 has been the major obstacle in the development of PhTX-433 insecticides.
