= Trauma and Dreams =

Book by Deirdre Barrett

- Author: Deirdre Barrett (Editor)
- Cover artist: Francisco Goya
- Language: English
- Publisher: Harvard University Press
- Publication date: 1996 hardcover/2001 paperback
- Publication place: United States
- Pages: 282
- ISBN: 9780674006904

Trauma and Dreams is a 1996 book edited by Deirdre Barrett and published by Harvard University Press. Chapter authors are prominent psychologists and physicians including Oliver Sacks and Robert J. Lifton.

Barrett opens the Introduction with a quote from poet Elias Canetti, "All the things one has forgotten / scream for help in dreams." The book describes how trauma affects the content of dreams, differentiating between the typical effects of adult vs. childhood trauma and between one-time traumas vs. those that are experienced repeatedly. It discusses what dreaming can tell us about trauma and how dreamwork may be employed in psychotherapy to aid the recovery from post-traumatic stress disorder (PTSD).

== Reviews ==
- "Trauma and Dreams provides evidence that important information can be gleaned through examination of [PTSD] dreams...Barrett's coverage of the subject is far-reaching, with dream research on war veterans, rape survivors, kidnapping victims, multiple personality patients, and traumatized children. Barrett also considers the connection between dreams and relatively commonplace traumas such as divorce and bereavement...Trauma and Dreams is well researched and includes contributions by several experts in the fields of trauma and dream analysis." – Choice
- "Trauma and Dreams is...an honest and compassionate book, based usually on direct clinical experience and mercifully free of second-hand-trauma-posturing by cultural studies professors." – Ben Shephard The Times Literary Supplement
- "Violence against one's person, one's body or one's race is difficult to forget and the representation of such violence in one's dreams is therefore persistent. Trauma and Dreams is a collection of essays that attests to these twin truths by describing a wide variety of studies on the longevity and evolution of unhappy dream memories. For clinicians and for trauma victims, the book thus presents its 'Lest We Forget' thesis most emphatically. The authors and their information are privileged communications of a message that is important to human morality.

"Beyond that important, but non-scientific import, the book also provides a few interesting surprises for the student of sleep and dreams. One is Ernest Hartmann's astute suggestion that the terrifying dreams of post-trauma victims are neither nightmares nor night terrors but a completely unique species of nocturnal horror: the intrusion of unadulterated waking visions into almost any stage of sleep. Another is Oliver Sack’s view of dreaming as a possible aid in the diagnosis of emerging degeneration in the brain." – J. Allan Hobson in Nature Medicine
