= The Pregnant Man and Other Cases from a Hypnotherapist's Couch =

2010 book by Deirdre Barrett

- Author: Deirdre Barrett
- Language: English
- Publisher: Times Books/Random House
- Publication date: 1998
- Publication place: United States
- Pages: 238
- ISBN: 978-0812929058

The Pregnant Man and Other Cases from a Hypnotherapist's Couch is a book by Deirdre Barrett published by W. W. Norton & Company in 2010. Barrett is a psychologist on the faculty of Harvard Medical School. The book describes seven real patients, disguised for anonymity, who Barrett treated with hypnotherapy. They are presented in chronological order, beginning when the author was a trainee, so that much information about hypnosis is woven into the stories as Barrett herself is learning. The title character is a transgender man who develops false pregnancy after the death of his boyfriend. Other patients include an asthmatic with a heavy smoking habit, a wealthy aristocrat with a fear of flying, a writer who suddenly cannot read, and two very different cases of multiple personality. The book concludes with a section on how interested readers can locate a reputable hypnotherapist.

== Reviews ==
"Written with an Oliver Sacks-like openness to psychological realism, Barrett's reminiscences are nothing if not mesmerizing." – Entertainment Weekly

"As the title indicates, some strange cases turn up in a hypnotherapist's office, and there's a choice assortment of them in this little collection that both entertains and explicates the hypotherapist's art. ... From a skilled psychotherapist, a fine introduction to hypnosis." – Kirkus Reviews

"Fans of Oliver Sacks will recognize the narrative strategy in Barrett's exploration of how the seemingly unretrievable past rises to the surface as the patient, guided by the therapist, attempts to recover lost memories – the seeming source of his or her psychic discomfort. With circumspection, detachment and humor, Barrett, a practicing hypnotherapist who teaches at Harvard Medical School, presents seven case studies from her 20-year practice that 'unfolded in my office like plays'" – Publishers' Weekly
