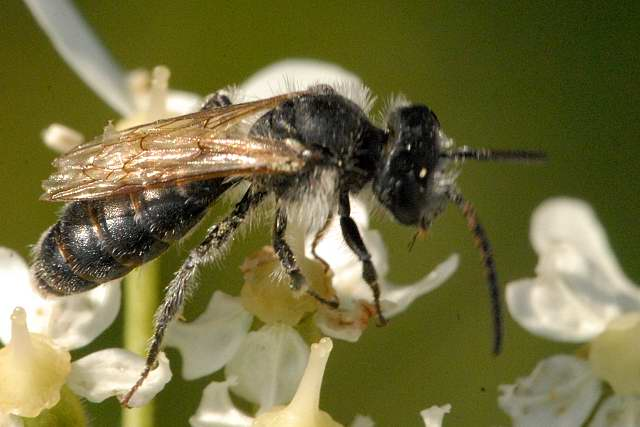

Scientific classification
- Domain: Eukaryota
- Kingdom: Animalia
- Phylum: Arthropoda
- Class: Insecta
- Order: Hymenoptera
- Family: Halictidae
- Tribe: Halictini
- Genus: Lasioglossum
- Species: L. zonulus

Binomial name
- Lasioglossum zonulus (Smith, 1848)

Synonyms
- Halictus zonulus Smith, 1848; Halictus craterus Lovell, 1908; Halictus craternus Cockerell, 1916 (missp.); Lasioglossum zonulum Auctt. (missp.)

= Lasioglossum zonulus =

Species of bee

Lasioglossum zonulus is a species of sweat bee in the family Halictidae. It is found in Europe and North America. While the name has historically been misspelled "zonulum" (e.g.), the original name, zonulus, is a noun and does not change spelling under Article 31 of the ICZN, and some sources (e.g.) have recognized this and adopted the correct spelling.
