= Deirdre Barrett =

American psychologist who studies dreams, hypnosis and imagery

- Occupation: Author

Academic work
- Main interests: Dreams; hypnosis; imagery

Deirdre Barrett is an American author and psychologist known for her research on dreams, hypnosis and imagery, and has written on evolutionary psychology. Barrett is a teacher at Harvard Medical School, and a past president of the International Association for the Study of Dreams (IASD) and of the American Psychological Association's Div. 30, the Society for Psychological Hypnosis. She is editor-in-chief of the journal Dreaming: The Journal of the Association for the Study of Dreams and a consulting editor for Imagination, Cognition, and Personality and The International Journal for Clinical and Experimental Hypnosis.

She has written five books for the general public: The Pregnant Man and Other Cases From a Hypnotherapist's Couch (1998), The Committee of Sleep (2001), Waistland (2007), Supernormal Stimuli (2010), and Pandemic Dreams (2020). She is the editor of four academic books: Trauma and Dreams (1996), The New Science of Dreaming (2007), Hypnosis and Hypnotherapy (2010), and The Encyclopedia of Sleep and Dreams (2012).

== Research ==
Barrett is best known for her work on dreams and their contributions to creativity and objective problem-solving. She interviewed modern artists and scientists about their use of their dreams, documenting dramatic anecdotes including Nobel Prizes and MacArthur Foundation 'genius grants' whose ideas originated in dreams. She also conducted research asking college students to incubate answers to real-life homework and other objective problems on which they were working, finding that in one week's time, half had dreamed about their topic and half of those had a dream which provided an answer. Barrett describes dreaming as simply "thinking in different biochemical state" and believes we continue to work on all the same problems—personal and objective—in that state. Her research concludes that while anything—math, musical composition, business dilemmas—may get solved during dreaming, the two areas dreams are especially likely to help are 1) anything where vivid visualization contributes to the solution, whether in artistic design or invention of 3-D technological devices and 2) any problem where the solution lies in thinking outside the box—i.e. where the person is stuck because the conventional wisdom on how to approach the problem is wrong.

Barrett has also conducted research on lucid dreams and on helping people suffering from PTSD to incubate mastery dreams to change their nightmares, and published studies tracking the progression of dreams during bereavement. She has studied characteristics of dreams in various disorders including depression and dissociative disorders. During the summer 2010 publicity about the dream-themed film Inception, Barrett was interviewed by media including ABC, NBC Today, CNN, The Wall Street Journal, The New York Times, and USA Today, pointing out that some aspects of the film, like lucid dreaming, control of one's own dreams, and dreams-within-dreams were highly realistic while the control of others' dreams, time slowing in dreams, and absolute impossibility of dreaming that you die were all fictional premises in the service of the thriller plot.

Barrett's studies of hypnosis have focused on different types of high hypnotizables, finding two subgroups, which she terms fantasizers and dissociaters. Fantasizers have vivid imaginations, find it easy to block out real-world stimuli, spend much time daydreaming, report imaginary companions as a child, and grow up with parents who encourage imaginary play. Dissociaters usually had a history of childhood abuse or other significant trauma, had learned to escape into numbness, and to forget unpleasant events. Their association with "daydreaming" was often going blank rather than vividly recalled fantasies. Both score equally high on formal scales of hypnotic susceptibility.

Other research by Barrett focused on the similarities and differences between daydreams and nocturnal dreaming and on the significance of earliest memories as reflecting a microcosm of an individual's worldview. Barrett is interested in film and has written on techniques which films use to represent dreams and on the negative stereotypes of hypnosis in film.

Most recently, Barrett has written on evolutionary psychology, especially the concept of supernormal stimuli—the idea that technology can create an artificial object that pulls an instinct more strongly than that for which it evolved. The phrase "supernormal stimuli" was coined by Dutch scientist Nikolaas Tinbergen in the 1930s. Barrett's book Waistland (2007) explores the weight and fitness crisis in terms of supernormal stimuli for food and rest. Her latest book, "Supernormal Stimuli: How Primal Urges Overran Their Evolutionary Purpose" (2010) examines the impact of supernormal stimuli on the diversion of impulses for nurturing, sexuality, romance, territoriality, war, and the entertainment industry's hijacking of our social instincts.

== Selected publications ==
=== Books ===
- The Pregnant Man: and Other Cases from a Hypnotherapist's Couch (Times Books, 1998) ISBN 9780812929058
- Trauma and Dreams (Harvard University Press, 2001) ISBN 0674006909
- Waistland: The (R)Evolutionary Science Behind Our Weight and Fitness Crisis (Norton, 2007) ISBN 0393062163
- The New Science of Dreaming [3 volumes] (Praeger, 2007) ISBN 0275990451
- Hypnosis and Hypnotherapy [2 volumes] (Praeger, 2009) ISBN 0313356327
- The Committee of Sleep: How Artists, Scientists, and Athletes Use Their Dreams for Creative Problem Solving - and How You Can Too (Random House 2001; Oneiroi Press, 2010) ISBN 0982869509
- Supernormal Stimuli: How Primal Urges Overran Their Evolutionary Purpose (Norton, 2010) ISBN 039306848X
- Encyclopedia of Sleep and Dreams: The Evolution, Function, Nature, and Mysteries of Slumber [2 volumes] (Greenwood, 2012) ISBN 0313386641
