= Nigel Spivey =

British classicist and academic (born 1958)

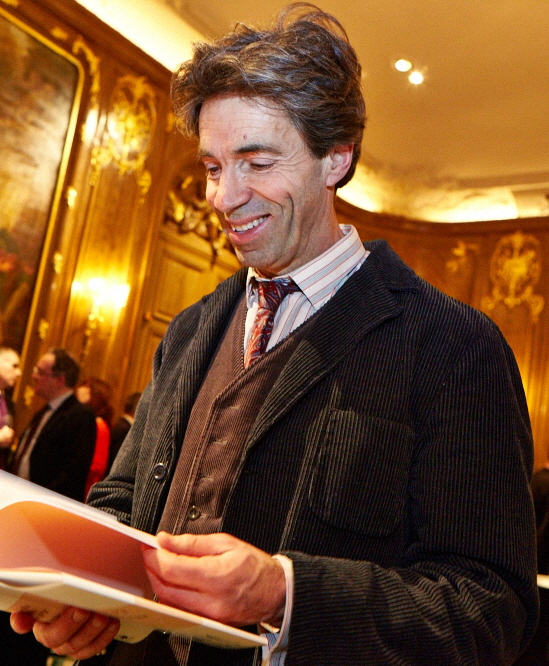
- Nigel Spivey on 7 March 2013
- Born: 18 October 1958 (age 67)

Academic background
- Education: Caterham School
- Alma mater: Emmanuel College, Cambridge

Academic work
- Discipline: Classical studies
- Sub-discipline: Etruscan iconography, polychromy in Greek sculpture
- Institutions: University of Cambridge

Nigel Jonathan Spivey (born 18 October 1958) is a British classicist and academic, specialising in classical art and archaeology. He is a senior lecturer in classics at the University of Cambridge and a fellow of Emmanuel College. After attending Caterham, he studied at Cambridge, the British School at Rome, and the University of Pisa.

As an undergraduate, he was a three-time champion in hammer throw at the Oxford–Cambridge athletics match; he remains a member of the Achilles Club, an Oxbridge sports organisation. During the 1990s, he conducted "Lunch with the FT" interviews for the Financial Times newspaper alongside his academic career. (Note: The morning after one such interview, with the poet Gavin Ewart, Spivey received a call from Ewart's wife: "There are two things you need to know," she said. "The first is that Gavin came home yesterday happier than I have seen him in a long time. The second – and you are not to feel bad about this – is that he died this morning.")

== TV ==
He has presented various television series:

- For the BBC: How Art Made the World, 2005
- For ITV: Digging for Jesus, 2005
- For Channel 5: Kings and Queens, and Heroes of World War II.
- For the BBC: “Cunk on Earth”, Season 1, episodes 1–2, 2022.

== Published works include ==
- Understanding Greek Sculpture (1996)
- Etruscan Art (1997)
- Greek Art (1997)
- Enduring Creation: Art, Pain, and Fortitude (2001)
- Panorama of the Classical World (with Michael Squire) (2004)
- The Ancient Olympics: War Minus the Shooting (2004)
- Songs On Bronze: The Greek Myths Made Real (2005)
- Greek Sculpture (2013), an "entire renovation" of Understanding Greek Sculpture.
