= Hawk/goose effect =

Behavior observed in some young birds when another bird flies above them

In ethology and cognitive ethology, the hawk/goose effect refers to a behavior observed in some young birds when another bird flies above them: if the flying bird is a goose, the young birds show no reaction, but if the flying bird is a hawk, the young birds either become more agitated or cower to reduce the danger. The observation that short-necked and long-tailed birds flying overhead caused alarm was noted by Oskar Heinroth. Friedrich Goethe conducted experiments with silhouettes to examine alarm reactions in 1937 and a more systematic study was conducted in the same year by Konrad Lorenz and Nikolaas Tinbergen which is considered one of the classic experiments of ethology.

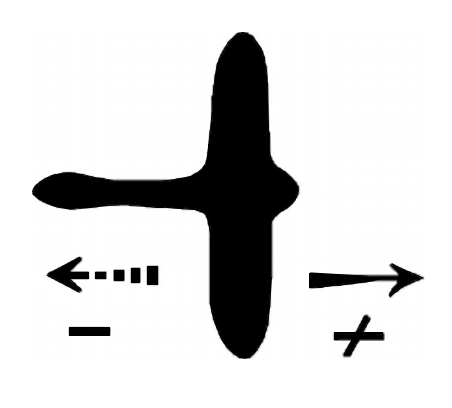
One of the goose/hawk models as reported by Tinbergen. Moving it from right to left (in the direction of dashed arrow) produced no response, but moving it from left to right (in the direction of solid arrow) elicited the behavior.

As part of their introducing experimentalism into animal behavior research they performed experiments in which they made 2-dimensional silhouettes of various bird-like shapes and moved them across the young birds' line of vision. Goose-like shapes were ignored while hawk-like shapes produced the response. Later Tinbergen reported that a single shape that was sort of an abstract composite of the hawk and goose silhouettes could produce the effect if moved in one direction but not the other. A study later confirmed that perception of an object was influenced by the direction of motion because the object in question was considered to be moving forwards in that direction. Initially thought to be an inborn instinct developed from natural selection, it was subsequently shown by others to be socially reinforced by other birds.

== Hawk or goose distinguished by direction of movement ==
Just like what is seen in Tinbergen’s 1951 experiment the same figure is used to represent both the hawk and the goose in most hawk/goose experiments. When moving the figure in one direction, it represents a shape resembling a hawk (short neck long tail) while moving the figure in the opposite direction resembles a goose (long neck short tail). The perceived identity influences how the figure is perceived to move, such that the figure is assumed to be a hawk or a goose based on the movement in direction of the head and the protrusion of the wings (short on one end and a long one on the other).

== Innate or learned behaviour ==
=== A brief history pointing to innate behavior ===
Friedrich Goethe was the first to perform experiments using silhouettes (1937, 1940). He found that naive Capercaillie exhibited a greater fear response to a silhouette of a hawk than to a circle, a triangle, or a generalized bird silhouette, but that this varied with both species, and prior experience. Nikolaas Tinbergen, in 1951, pointed out that he was inspired by Oskar Heinroth's observations in which he stated that domestic chickens are more alarmed by short-necked birds than long-necked ones. This provoked Konrad Lorenz and Nikolaas Tinbergen to design and explore the hawk/goose effect. They worked together in 1937 on experiments that were each published separately in 1939. Lorenz and Tinbergen reported differences in their experiments, with Lorenz arguing that a short neck only elicits a flight response in turkeys, while Tinbergen claimed: “The reactions of young gallinaceous birds, ducks, and geese to a flying bird of prey are released by the sign-stimulus ‘short neck’ among others”. Tinbergen published 2 papers in 1948 on the subject. In 1951, Tinbergen continued to report on what he described as innate behavior and stated that goslings display a fear response when an ambiguous goose-hawk figure was moved in the "hawk" direction, implying that goslings associate a particular shape with a particular direction of motion.

There have been a number of other studies supporting Tinbergen's short-neck hypothesis, with some as recent as the 1980s such as Helmut C. Mueller and Patricia G. Parker, in 1980, demonstrated that naive mallard ducklings show a greater variance in heart rate to the hawk models over the goose models. They concluded that cardiac response is an excellent measurement of fear and controlled for learned behavior by maintaining the ducklings in a brooder until they were transported to their laboratory in opaque containers. In 1982, Elizabeth L. Moore and Helmut C. Mueller found that a chick's heart rate was of greater variance in response to the hawk model without prior, pertinent experience, suggesting a greater innate fear response to the hawk over the goose. Obvious behavioral responses to fear were not identified.

Most ethologists today believe that the behaviors elicited by the hawk/goose models are socially reinforced or are more likely to support the Schleit's "selective habituation hypothesis".

=== A brief history pointing to learned behavior ===
After discrepancies between the results of Konrad Lorenz and Nikolaas Tinbergen, Hirsch et al. in 1955, concluded that Tinbergen's hypothesis could not be replicated in Leghorn chicken In 1960, McNiven, concluded that Tinbergen's hypothesis could not be replicated in ducklings, and in an attempt to replicate Tinbergen's experiments, Schleit's, in 1961 believed that Tinbergen falsified his data. Like the experiments that still support Tinbergan's short-neck hypothesis, there are many experiments that do not.

== Controversy ==
Konrad Lorenz met Nikolaas Tinbergen in 1936 at the Leiden Instinct Symposium. In 1937, they worked on two projects: an experimental analysis of egg-rolling behavior in the greylag goose, supporting the fixed action pattern hypothesis, and the responses of various young birds to cardboard models of raptors and other flying birds.

Based on Oskar Heinroth’s hypothesis that domestic chickens showed the greatest amount of fear towards long-tailed short-necked birds flying overhead, Tinbergen and Lorenz designed silhouettes that could represent a hawk-like figure if moved in one direction, or a goose-like figure if moved in the other direction. Tinbergen and Lorenz moved the models overhead of various species of birds and recorded their responses.

Tinbergen believed that these experiments prove Heinroth’s hypothesis, but Lorenz noted that the shape of the model did not seem to matter for all species except turkeys. He pointed out that all other species presented alarm responses (fixating, alarm calling and marching off to cover), regardless of the model used and that “slow relative speed” of a flying object can elicit an anti-predator response. Lorenz and Tinbergen published their original findings separately in 1939. Re-examination of the experiments were invoked due to the differences in results.

In 1955, Hirsch et al. presented that Tinbergen's hypothesis could not be replicated in Leghorn chicken. Schleidt, in 1961, did his best to replicate Tinbergen’s experiments using free-ranging geese, ducks, and turkeys and found that regardless of the shape, these birds presented a fear response that diminished over a number of trials, pointing to the likelihood of habituation. Schleidt did find evidence to support Lorenz’s “slow relative speed” findings. A second experiment was performed by Schleidt in 1961 to determine whether turkeys, who have never been exposed to a flying object, would support Tinbergen’s predisposition hypothesis and present a fear response to the hawk-shaped object in the hawk/goose model. Schleidt used 5 bronze turkeys that were raised indoors with no windows. Schleidt’s results again supported the “selective habituation hypothesis”, and not innate behavior. Thus, the short-neck hypothesis appears to have been falsified by Tinbergen.
