= Common ragwort =

Common ragwort is a common name for several plants and may refer to:

- Jacobaea vulgaris, native to northern Eurasia
- Pericallis × hybrida
