= Supernormal Stimuli =

2010 book by Deirdre Barrett

- Author: Deirdre Barrett
- Language: English
- Publisher: W. W. Norton & Company
- Publication date: 2010
- Publication place: United States
- Pages: 224
- ISBN: 978-0393068481

Supernormal Stimuli: How Primal Urges Overran Their Evolutionary Purpose is a book by Deirdre Barrett published by W. W. Norton & Company in 2010. Barrett is a psychologist on the faculty of Harvard Medical School. The book argues that human instincts for food, sex, and territorial protection evolved for life on the savannah 10,000 years ago, not for today's densely populated technological world. This is known as an evolutionary mismatch. Our instincts have not had time to adapt to the rapid changes of modern life. The book takes its title from Nikolaas Tinbergen's concept in ethology of the supernormal stimulus, the phenomena by which insects, birds, and fish in his experiments could be lured by a dummy object which exaggerated one or more characteristic of the natural stimulus object such as giant brilliant blue plaster eggs which birds preferred to sit on in preference to their own. Barrett extends the concept to humans and outlines how supernormal stimuli are a driving force behind today's most pressing problems, including modern warfare, obesity and other fitness problems, while also explaining the appeal of television, video games, and pornography as social outlets.

== Contents ==
1. Supernormal Stimuli—What Are They?
2. Making the Ordinary Seem Strange
3. Sex for Dummies
4. Too Cute
5. Foraging in the Food Courts
6. Defending Home, Hearth, and Hedgefund
7. From Shakespeare to Survivor: Entertainment as Vicarious Socializing
8. Intellectual Pursuits as Supernormal Stimuli
9. Conclusion: Get Off the Plaster Egg

== Reception ==
The Wall Street Journal considered it "timely", but faulted Barrett for not "weigh(ing) the costs of supernormal stimuli against their often substantial benefits."
