= Luuk Tinbergen =

Dutch ornithologist and ecologist (1915–1955)

- Born: Lukas Tinbergen; 7 September 1915; The Hague, Netherlands
- Died: 1 September 1955 (aged 39); Groningen, Netherlands
- Education: Leiden University
- Known for: Search-image hypothesis
- Relatives: Jan Tinbergen (brother); Nikolaas Tinbergen (brother); Joost Tinbergen (son)
- Scientific career
- Fields: Ornithology, ecology
- Workplaces: University of Groningen
- Thesis: De Sperwer als roofvijand van zangvogels (1946)

Lukas "Luuk" Tinbergen (7 September 1915 – 1 September 1955) was a Dutch ornithologist and ecologist. His field research examined bird migration, habitat selection, the population ecology of birds of prey and songbirds, and interactions between insectivorous birds and their prey.

In 1949, Gerard Baerends recruited Tinbergen to the University of Groningen to develop field-based animal ecology. A later historical account described him as a behavioural ecologist before the term had been coined. His posthumously published research on insect-eating birds in pine woods included the influential search-image hypothesis, which proposed that repeated encounters with a particular prey type could improve a predator's ability to detect it.

His older brothers were the economist Jan Tinbergen, who received the first Nobel Memorial Prize in Economic Sciences in 1969, and the ethologist Nikolaas Tinbergen, who shared the 1973 Nobel Prize in Physiology or Medicine.

== Early life and education ==
Tinbergen was born in The Hague. As a young naturalist, he joined the Nederlandse Jeugdbond voor Natuurstudie, a Dutch youth association for nature study, where he developed as a field ornithologist and began publishing observations in the association's periodical, Amoeba.

He began studying biology at Leiden University in 1933 and completed his degree in 1939. He subsequently worked as an assistant to zoologist Jan Verwey at the Zoological Station in Den Helder and later led the bird-migration station on Texel. His early research included studies of the routes followed by migrating chaffinches and the effects of landscape, weather and wind on bird migration.

== Research and career ==
=== Bird communities and migration ===
Tinbergen's 1941 book Vogels in hun domein examined the relationship between woodland characteristics and the distribution of breeding birds. He surveyed birds in forest plots of ten hectares on the Veluwe and along the inner edge of the Dutch coastal dunes. He recorded differences in tree species, the age of the woodland, the amount of undergrowth and soil type, and related these characteristics to the species and numbers of birds found in each habitat. The book used Tinbergen's own illustrations to depict the characteristic bird communities of different types and ages of woodland.

He also continued his research into bird migration. His 1949 book Vogels onderweg presented work on migration across the Netherlands and discussed how migrating birds' routes were influenced by landscape, weather conditions and wind.

=== Sparrowhawks and songbird populations ===
In 1939, the Dutch bird-protection organisation Vogelbescherming Nederland commissioned Tinbergen to investigate the relationship between birds of prey and the population sizes of songbirds. After the Second World War, he continued this work at the Institute for Applied Biological Research in Nature.

The research became his doctoral thesis, De Sperwer als roofvijand van zangvogels ("The sparrowhawk as a predator of songbirds"), which he defended at Leiden University in 1946. The study combined counts and mapping of Eurasian sparrowhawks and their prey around Hulshorst on the northern Veluwe with analyses of predation and population dynamics. It was subsequently published as a 213-page issue of the ornithological journal Ardea.

=== University of Groningen ===
In 1949, Baerends recruited Tinbergen to the University of Groningen to establish a programme of field-based animal ecology. The position has been described as the first chair devoted to ecology in the Netherlands. Tinbergen was appointed professor of descriptive zoology in 1954.

At Groningen, he investigated the relationships between birds and insect populations in pine woods. His research team studied the prey brought to nestlings by free-living tits and compared the birds' diets with the abundance of different insect prey in the surrounding woodland.

From these observations, Tinbergen proposed that birds did not detect all equally suitable prey with equal efficiency. Instead, repeated encounters with a particular type of prey could produce a perceptual change—a "specific search image"—that made that prey easier to recognise. Common prey could consequently be detected more readily than equally edible but less frequently encountered prey.

Tinbergen died before completing this research. Baerends, C. G. de Ruiter and other colleagues and students worked through his notes and unpublished material, which formed the basis of the posthumous monograph The Dynamics of Insect and Bird Populations in Pine Woods, published in 1960.

== Personal life and death ==
Tinbergen had two sons. His elder son, Tijs Tinbergen, became a documentary filmmaker, while his younger son, Joost Tinbergen, became an ecologist.

Tinbergen died by suicide in Groningen on 1 September 1955, six days before his fortieth birthday. In 1994, Tijs Tinbergen made the documentary Gebiologeerd as a tribute to his father and an examination of his father's life and death.

== Legacy ==
Tinbergen combined detailed field observation with quantitative analysis of populations and ecological relationships. In his contemporary obituary, ornithologist Karel Voous emphasised Tinbergen's persistence, direct observation and rigorous analysis, and identified his later studies of relationships between predators and prey in woodland communities as an important synthesis of his research.

When preparing The Natural Regulation of Animal Numbers (1954), British ornithologist David Lack asked Tinbergen to review the portions of chapters 12–14 that dealt with Tinbergen's own research. The book's bibliography cited four of Tinbergen's publications on raptor ecology, woodland birds and bird migration. The volume also reproduced drawings by Tinbergen, including a colour frontispiece depicting a great tit carrying a caterpillar of the pine beauty moth; Lack additionally credited him with drawing figures 33 and 36.

His work at Groningen anticipated the later development of behavioural ecology by analysing animal behaviour in relation to population size, food availability and interactions among species. The search-image hypothesis continued to generate experimental and theoretical research into predator attention, prey selection and the survival advantage of rare prey forms.

== Selected publications ==
- Tinbergen, L. (1941). Vogels in hun domein (in Dutch). Amsterdam: Scheltema & Holkema.
- Tinbergen, L. (1941). "Over de trekwegen van vinken (Fringilla coelebs L.)". Ardea (in Dutch). 30 (1–2): 42–73.
- Tinbergen, L. (1946). "De Sperwer als roofvijand van zangvogels". Ardea (in Dutch). 34 (1–3): 1–213.
- Tinbergen, L. (1949). Vogels onderweg (in Dutch). Amsterdam: Scheltema & Holkema.
- Kluyver, H.N.; Tinbergen, L. (1953). "Territory and the regulation of density in titmice". Archives Néerlandaises de Zoologie. 10: 265–289.
- Tinbergen, L. (1960). The Dynamics of Insect and Bird Populations in Pine Woods. Leiden: E.J. Brill.
