= Nikolaas Tinbergen =

Dutch zoologist and ethologist (1907–1988)

Niko Tinbergen FRS
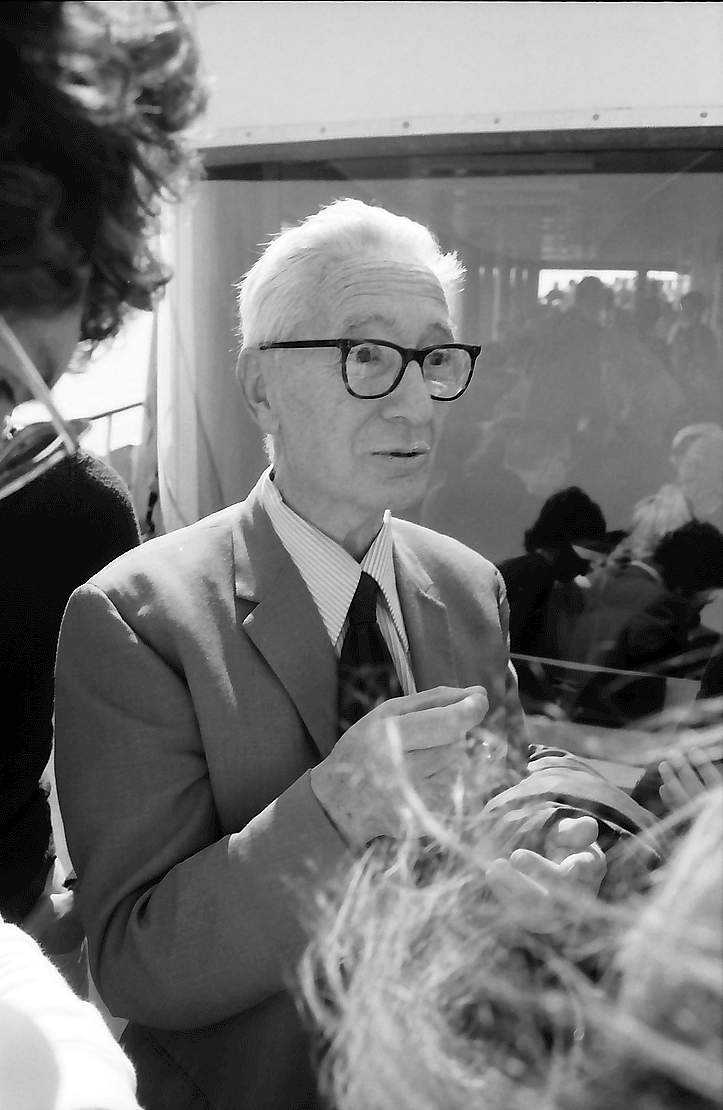
- Tinbergen in 1978
- Born: Nikolaas Tinbergen; 15 April 1907; The Hague, Netherlands
- Died: 21 December 1988 (aged 81); Oxford, England
- Education: Leiden University
- Known for: One of the founders of ethology; Hawk/goose effect; Tinbergen's four questions
- Spouse: Elisabeth Rutten (1912–1988)
- Children: 5
- Relatives: Luuk Tinbergen, Jan Tinbergen (brothers)
- Awards: Nobel Prize in Physiology or Medicine (1973)
- Scientific career
- Fields: Zoology; Ethology
- Workplaces: University of Oxford
- Doctoral advisor: Hilbrand Boschma
- Doctoral students: John Michael Cullen; Marian Dawkins; Richard Dawkins; Iain Douglas-Hamilton; Aubrey Manning; Desmond Morris; Anthony Sinclair; Nicholas Blurton-Jones
- Author abbrev. (zoology): Tinbergen

Nikolaas "Niko" Tinbergen (/ˈtɪnbɜːrɡən/ TIN-bur-gən, Dutch: [ˈnikoː(laːs) ˈtɪmbɛrɣə(n)]; 15 April 1907 – 21 December 1988) was a Dutch biologist and ornithologist who shared the 1973 Nobel Prize in Physiology or Medicine with Karl von Frisch and Konrad Lorenz for their discoveries concerning the organization and elicitation of individual and social behavior patterns in animals. He is regarded as one of the founders of ethology, the study of animal behaviour, and an important figure in the development of that discipline into its contemporary form, behavioral ecology.

In 1951, he published The Study of Instinct, an influential book on animal behaviour. In the 1960s, he collaborated with filmmaker Hugh Falkus on a series of wildlife films, including The Riddle of the Rook (1972) and Signals for Survival (1969), which won the Italia prize in that year and the American blue ribbon in 1971.

== Early life and education ==
Born in The Hague, Netherlands, he was one of five children of Dirk Cornelis Tinbergen and his wife Jeannette van Eek. His brother, Jan Tinbergen, won the first Bank of Sweden Prize in Economic Sciences in Memory of Alfred Nobel in 1969. They are the only siblings to each win a Nobel Prize. Another brother, Luuk Tinbergen, was also a noted biologist.

Tinbergen's interest in nature manifested itself when he was young. He studied biology at Leiden University. His doctoral thesis, published in 1932, examined how female European beewolfs (Philanthus triangulum) use visual landmarks to find their nests. He was a prisoner of war during World War II in Kamp Sint-Michielsgestel. Tinbergen's experience as a prisoner of the Nazis led to some friction with longtime intellectual collaborator Konrad Lorenz, and it was several years before the two reconciled.

After the war, Tinbergen moved to England, where he taught at the University of Oxford and was a fellow first at Merton College, Oxford, and later at Wolfson College, Oxford. Several of his graduate students went on to become prominent biologists, including Richard Dawkins, Marian Dawkins, Desmond Morris, Iain Douglas-Hamilton, and Tony Sinclair.

== The Study of Instinct ==
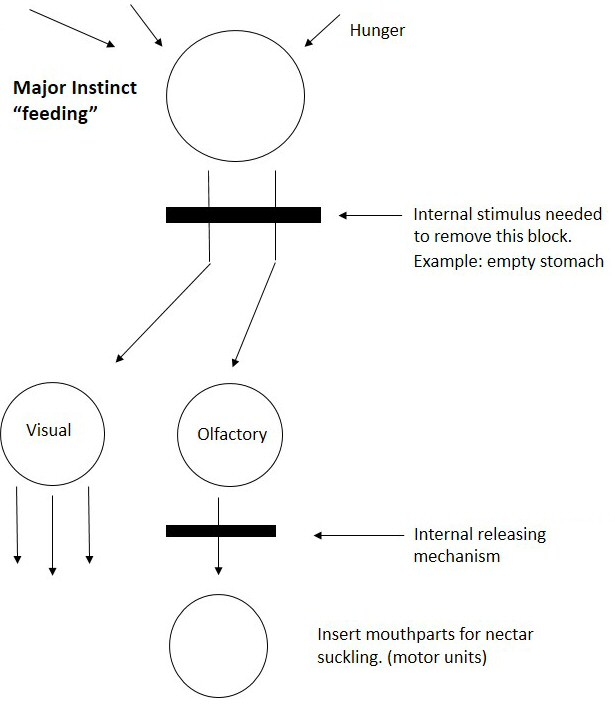
Tinbergen's hierarchical model. Modified from The Study of Instinct (1951).

In 1951 Tinbergen's The Study of Instinct was published. Behavioural ecologists and evolutionary biologists still recognise the contribution this book offered the field of behavioural science studies. The Study of Instinct summarises Tinbergen's ideas on innate behavioural reactions in animals and the adaptiveness and evolutionary aspects of these behaviours. By behaviour, he means the total movements made by the intact animal; innate behaviour is that which is not changed by the learning process. The major question of the book is the role of internal and external stimuli in controlling the expression of behaviour.

In particular, he was interested in explaining "spontaneous" behaviours: those that occurred in their complete form the first time they were performed and that seemed resistant to the effects of learning. He explains how behaviour can be considered a combination of these spontaneous behaviour patterns and as set series of reactions to particular stimuli. Behaviour is a reaction in that to a certain extent it is reliant on external stimuli, however, it is also spontaneous, since it is also dependent upon internal causal factors.

His model for how certain behavioural reactions are provoked was based on work by Konrad Lorenz. Lorenz postulated that for each instinctive act there is a specific energy which builds up in a reservoir in the brain. In this model, Lorenz envisioned a reservoir with a spring valve at its base that an appropriate stimulus could act on, much like a weight on a scale pan pulling against a spring and releasing the reservoir of energy, an action which would lead an animal to express the desired behaviour.

Tinbergen added complexity to this model, a model now known as Tinbergen's hierarchical model. He suggested that motivational impulses build up in nervous centres in the brain, which are held in check by blocks. The blocks are removed by an innate releasing mechanism that allows the energy to flow to the next centre (each centre containing a block that needs to be removed) in a cascade until the behaviour is expressed. Tinbergen's model shows multiple levels of complexity and that related behaviours are grouped.

An example is in his experiments with foraging honey bees. He showed that honey bees show curiosity for yellow and blue paper models of flowers, and suggested that these were visual stimuli causing the buildup of energy in one specific centre. However, the bees rarely landed on the model flowers unless the proper odour was also applied. In this case, the chemical stimuli of the odour allowed the next link in the chain to be released, encouraging the bee to land. The final step was for the bee to insert its mouthparts into the flower and initiate suckling. Tinbergen envisioned this as concluding the reaction set for honey bee feeding behaviour.

== Nobel Prize ==
In 1973, Tinbergen, along with Konrad Lorenz and Karl von Frisch, were awarded the Nobel Prize in Physiology or Medicine "for their discoveries concerning organization and elicitation of individual and social behaviour patterns". The award recognised their studies on genetically programmed behaviour patterns, their origins, maturation and their elicitation by key stimuli. In his Nobel Lecture, Tinbergen addressed the somewhat unconventional decision of the Nobel Foundation to award the prize for Physiology or Medicine to three men who had until recently been regarded as "mere animal watchers". Tinbergen stated that their revival of the "watching and wondering" approach to studying behaviour could indeed contribute to the relief of human suffering.

The studies performed by the trio on fish, insects and birds laid the foundation for further studies on the importance of specific experiences during critical periods of normal development, as well as the effects of abnormal psychosocial situations in mammals. At the time, these discoveries were stated to have caused "a breakthrough in the understanding of the mechanisms behind various symptoms of psychiatric disease, such as anguish, compulsive obsession, stereotypic behaviour and catatonic posture". Tinbergen's contribution to these studies included the testing of the hypotheses of Lorenz/von Frisch by means of "comprehensive, careful, and ingenious experiments" as well as his work on supernormal stimuli. The work of Tinbergen during this time was also regarded as having possible implications for further research in child development and behaviour.

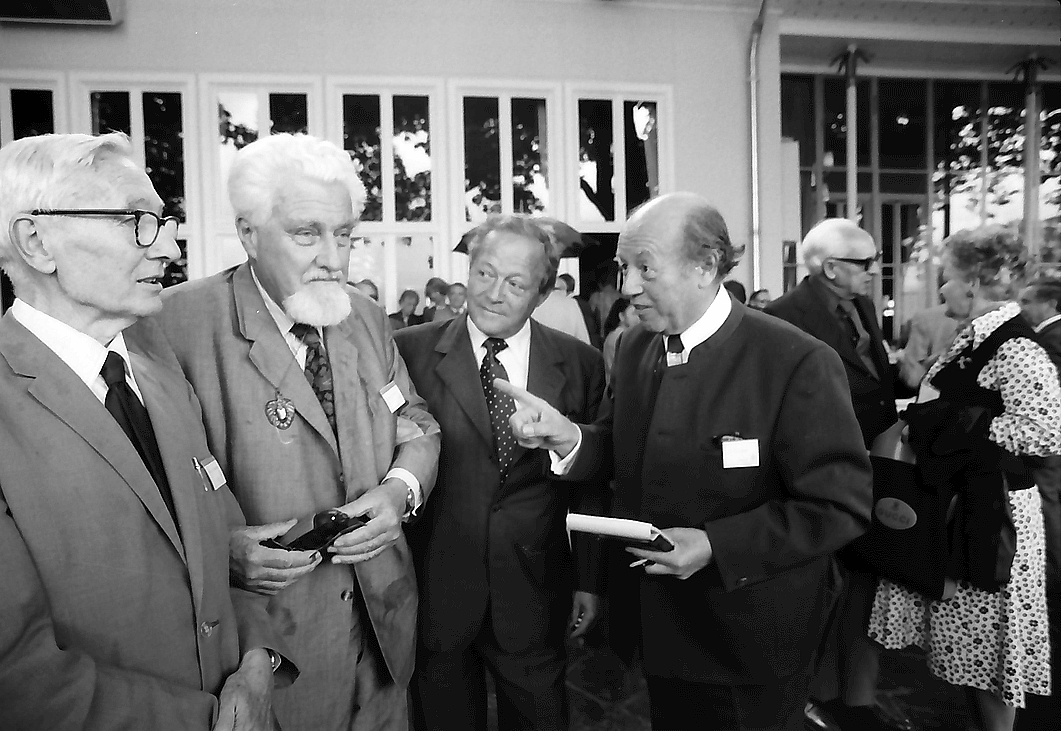
Tinbergen (foreground, far left) at a 1978 Nobel laureate event with (from left) Konrad Lorenz, Feodor Lynen, and Ernst von Khuon. In the back, Severo Ochoa and Eva Lynen.

He also caused some intrigue by dedicating a large part of his acceptance speech to F. M. Alexander, originator of the Alexander technique, a method which investigates postural reflexes and responses in human beings.

== Other awards and honours ==
In 1950 Tinbergen became member of the Royal Netherlands Academy of Arts and Sciences. He was elected a Fellow of the Royal Society (FRS) in 1962. He was elected to the American Academy of Arts and Sciences in 1961, the United States National Academy of Sciences in 1974, and the American Philosophical Society in 1975. He was also awarded the Godman-Salvin Medal in 1969 by the British Ornithologists' Union, and in 1973 received the Swammerdam Medal and Wilhelm Bölsche Medal (from the Genootschap ter bervordering van Natuur-, Genees- en Heelkunde of the University of Amsterdam and the Kosmos-Gesellschaft der Naturfreunde respectively).

== Approach to animal behaviour ==
Tinbergen described four questions he believed should be asked of any animal behaviour, which were:

1. Causation (mechanism): what are the stimuli that elicit the response, and how has it been modified by recent learning? How do behaviour and psyche "function" on the molecular, physiological, neuro-ethological, cognitive and social level, and what do the relations between the levels look like? (compare with Nicolai Hartmann's "The laws about the levels of complexity").
2. Development (ontogeny): how does the behaviour change with age, and what early experiences are necessary for the behaviour to be shown? Which developmental steps (the ontogenesis follows an "inner plan") and which environmental factors play when / which role? (compare with recapitulation theory).
3. Function (adaptation): how does the behaviour impact on the animal's chances of survival and reproduction?
4. Evolution (phylogeny): how does the behaviour compare with similar behaviour in related species, and how might it have arisen through the process of phylogeny? Why did structural associations (behaviour can be seen as a "time space structure") evolve in this manner and not otherwise?

These have been long recognized in philosophy of biology to strongly correspond with the efficient, material, formal and final causes of Aristotelian causality, though Tinbergen does not reference Aristotle in his work. In ethology and sociobiology, causation and ontogeny are summarised as the "proximate mechanisms", while adaptation and phylogeny are the "ultimate mechanisms". They are still considered as the cornerstone of modern ethology, sociobiology and transdisciplinarity in human sciences.

== Supernormal stimulus ==
A major body of Tinbergen's research focused on what he termed the supernormal stimulus. This was the concept that one could build an artificial object which was a stronger stimulus or releaser for an instinct than the object for which the instinct originally evolved. He constructed plaster eggs to see which a bird preferred to sit on, finding that they would select those that were larger, had more defined markings, or more saturated colour—and a dayglo-bright one with black polka dots would be selected over the bird's own pale, dappled eggs.

Tinbergen found that territorial male three-spined stickleback (a small freshwater fish) would attack a wooden fish model more vigorously than a real male if its underside was redder. He constructed cardboard dummy butterflies with more defined markings that male butterflies would try to mate with in preference to real females. The superstimulus, by its exaggerations, clearly delineated what characteristics were eliciting the instinctual response.

Among the modern works calling attention to Tinbergen's classic work is Deirdre Barrett's 2010 book Supernormal Stimuli.

== Autism ==
Tinbergen applied his observational methods to the problems of autistic children. He recommended a "holding therapy" in which parents hold their autistic children for long periods of time while attempting to establish eye contact, even when a child resists the embrace. However, his interpretations of autistic behaviour, and the holding therapy that he recommended, lacked scientific support and has been described as controversial and potentially abusive, particularly by individuals with autism themselves.

== Bibliography ==
Some of the publications of Tinbergen are:

- 1939: The Behavior of the Snow Bunting in Spring. In: Transactions of the Linnaean Society of New York, vol. V (October 1939). OCLC 885412024.
- 1951: The Study of Instinct. Oxford: Clarendon Press. OCLC 249804809.
- 1952: Derived activities; their causation, biological significance, origin, and emancipation during evolution. Q. Rev. Biol. 27:1–32. doi:10.1086/398642.
- 1953: The Herring Gull's World. London: Collins. OCLC 781602203.
- 1953: Social Behaviour in Animals: With Special Reference to Vertebrates. Methuen & Co. OCLC 513004 (reprinted 2014): London & New York: Psychology Press. ISBN 978-1-84872-297-2, 978-1-315-84999-7 (print & eBook).

Publications about Tinbergen and his work:

- Burkhardt Jr., R. W. (2005). Patterns of Behavior: Konrad Lorenz, Niko Tinbergen, and the Founding of Ethology. ISBN 0-226-08090-0
- Kruuk, H. (2003). Niko's Nature: The Life of Niko Tinbergen and His Science of Animal Behaviour. Oxford: Oxford University Press. ISBN 0-19-851558-8.
- Stamp Dawkins, M.; Halliday, T. R.; Dawkins, R. (1991). The Tinbergen Legacy. London: Chapman & Hall. ISBN 0-412-39120-1.

== Personal life ==
Tinbergen was a member of the advisory committee to the Anti-Concorde Project and was also an atheist.

Tinbergen married Elisabeth Rutten (1912–1990); they had five children. Later in life he suffered depression and feared that he might, like his brother Luuk, take his own life. He was treated by his friend John Bowlby, whose ideas he had greatly influenced. Tinbergen died on 21 December 1988, after suffering a stroke at his home in Oxford, England.
