= Dream dictionary =

Tool for interpreting dream images

A dream dictionary (also known as oneirocritic literature) is a tool made for interpreting images in a dream. Dream dictionaries tend to include specific images which are attached to specific interpretations. However, dream dictionaries are generally not considered scientifically viable by those within the psychology community.

== History ==
Since the 19th century, the art of dream interpretation has been transferred to a scientific ground, making it a distinct part of psychology. However, the dream symbols of the "unscientific" days—‌the outcome of hearsay interpretations that differ around the world among different cultures—‌continued to mark the day of an average person, who is most likely unfamiliar with Freudian analysis of dreams.

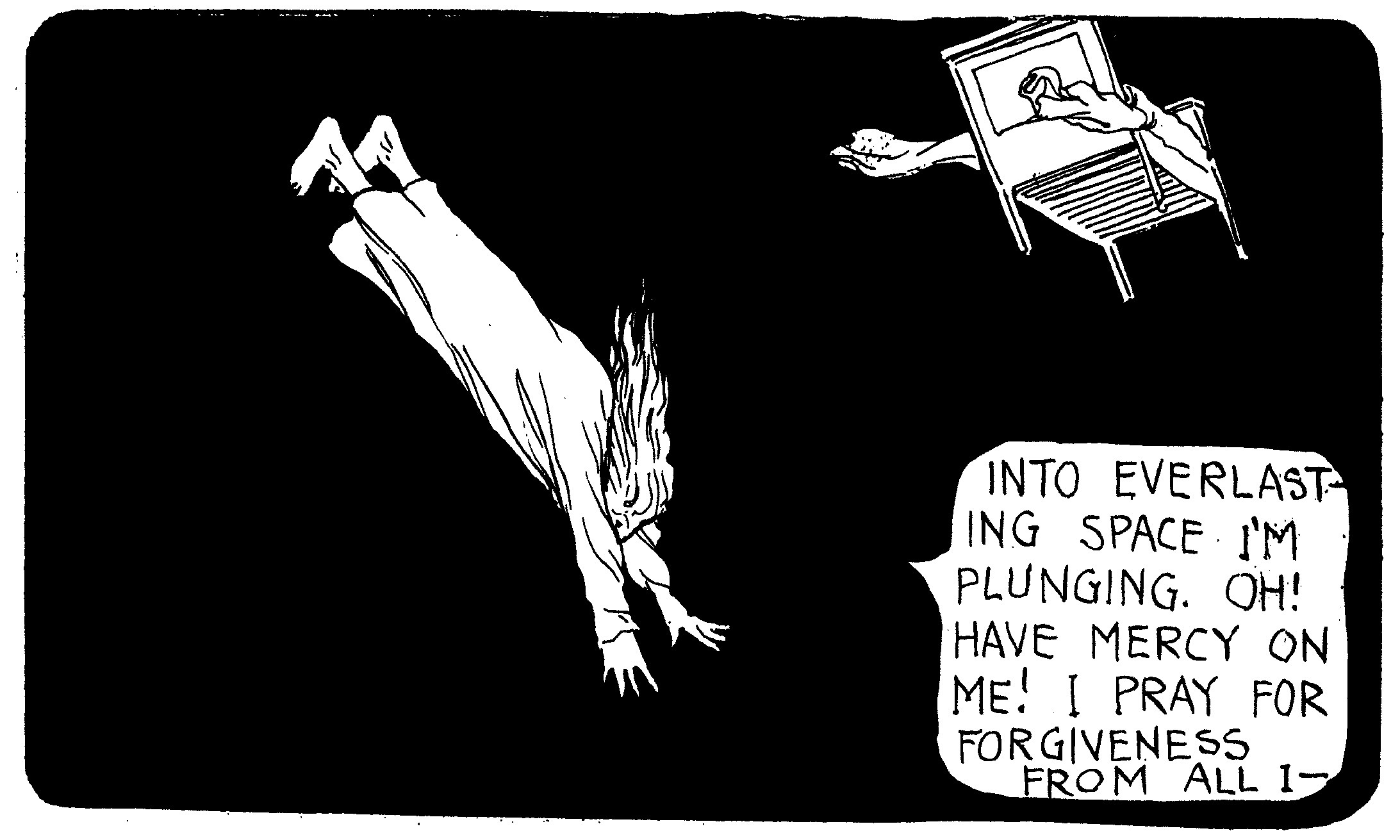
Dreams of falling may be seen as a warning to the dreamer

The dream dictionary includes interpretations of dreams, giving each symbol in a dream a specific meaning. The argument of what dreams represent has greatly changed over time. With this changing, so have the interpretation of dreams. Dream dictionaries have changed in content since they were first published. The ancient Greeks and Romans saw dreams as having a religious meaning. This made them believe that their dreams were an insight into the future and held the key to the solutions of their problems. Aristotle's view on dreams were that they were merely a function of our physiological makeup. He did not believe dreams have a greater meaning, solely that they are the result of how we sleep. In the Middle Ages, dreams were seen as an interpretation of good or evil.

Although the dream dictionary is not recognized in the psychology world, Freud is said to have revolutionized the interpretation and study of dreams. Freud came to the conclusion that dreams were a form of wish fulfillment. Dream dictionaries were first based upon Freudian thoughts and ancient interpretations of dreams.

== See also ==
- Dream journal
- Dream sharing
- Oneiromancy
- Psychoanalytic dream interpretation
- Recurring dream
- Smorfia
