= Content (Freudian dream analysis) =

Dream aspects in Freudian dream analysis

Content in Freudian dream analysis refers to two closely connected aspects of the dream: the manifest content (the dream itself as it is remembered), and the latent content (the hidden meaning of the dream). Impulses and drives residing in the unconscious press toward consciousness during sleep, but are only able to evade the censorship mechanism of repression by associating themselves with words, ideas and images that are acceptable to consciousness. Thus the dream as consciously remembered upon waking (the manifest content) is interpreted in psychoanalysis as a disguised or distorted representation of repressed desires (the latent content).

== Definitions ==
=== Manifest content ===
The manifest content is the dream that the conscious individual remembers experiencing. It consists of all the elements—images, thoughts, emotions, and other content—of which the individual is cognitively aware upon awakening. Illustrated through the iceberg analogy, the manifest content would be identified as the "tip": it is visible above the surface, but implies a large but invisible portion underneath. Although the succession of images and other elements in the manifest content may appear bizarre and nonsensical, analysis of individual elements can throw light upon the dream's underlying meaning.

=== Latent content ===
Related to—yet distinct from—the manifest content, the latent content of the dream is the unconscious thoughts, drives, and desires that lie behind the dream as it appears. These thoughts in their raw form are permanently barred from consciousness by the mechanism of repression, but continue to exert pressure in the direction of consciousness. Taking advantage of the relaxation of vigilance during sleep, the repressed thoughts are able to partially gain access by associating themselves with non-threatening thoughts and images, primarily by means of what Freud called condensation and displacement. Thus the manifest content is a representation of the latent content in a disguised and distorted form. Freud believed that by uncovering the meaning of one's hidden motivations and deeper ideas, an individual could successfully understand his or her internal struggles, and thus in psychoanalysis the manifest content of the dream is analyzed in order to understand the nature of the latent content.

== Interpreting dreams ==
The technique of free association, utilized by Freud in dream interpretation, often begins with a psychoanalyst's analysis of a specific dream element and the thoughts that automatically come to the analysand's mind in relation to it. Freud classified five separate processes that facilitate dream analysis.

1. Displacement occurs when the desire for one thing or person is symbolized by something or someone else.
2. Projection happens when the dreamer places their own personal desires and wants onto another person.
3. Symbolization is illustrated through a dreamer's unconscious allowing of repressed urges and desires to be metaphorically acted out.
4. Condensation illustrates the process by which the dreamer hides their feelings and/or urges through either contraction or minimizing its representation into a brief dream image or event
5. Rationalization (also referred to as secondary revision) can be identified as the final stage of dreamwork in which the dreaming mind intently organizes an incoherent dream into something much more comprehensible and logical for the dreamer
