= Microgame =

The term microgame can refer to several subjects including:

- MicroGame, line of board games by Metagaming Concepts
- Microgame (board games), type of board game or wargame
- Microgame (company), Italian gambling company
- Microgames, minigames in the Wario series

== See also ==
- Micronesian Games, international multi-sport event
- Minigame, short game within a video game
