= Wren-Lewis =

Wren-Lewis is an English surname. Notable people with the surname include:

- John Wren-Lewis (1923–2006), British psychologist, scientist, and professor
- Simon Wren-Lewis (born 1953), British economist and professor
