= Ann Faraday =

British psychologist

Academic background
- Education: University College London (BS, PhD)
- Thesis: Factors Affecting the Experimental Recall of Dreams (1969)

Academic work
- Discipline: Psychologist
- Sub-discipline: Dream analysis
- Notable works: Dream Power (1972)

Ann Faraday was a British psychologist, who conducted an experimental study of dreams for her PhD thesis at University College London. After several years in experimental dream research, she then trained in hypnotherapy, Freudian and Jungian analysis and Gestalt therapy. She was a pioneer of the Human Potential Movement and the Association for Humanistic Psychology in Great Britain. She was born in 1923, and died in 2006.

She is considered a pioneer of the empirical evaluation of the content of dreams. She is the author of two books about dream interpretation: the bestseller Dream Power, and The Dream Game. The Dream Game devotes a chapter to puns in dreams, including verbal puns, reversal puns, visual puns, puns involving proper names, puns involving literal pictures of colloquial or slang metaphors, and puns involving literal picture of common body language. From the 1970s, Faraday appeared on many radio shows and workshops for the purpose of recording and interpreting of dreams.

According to the Encyclopedia of Psychology, "writers and psychologists, such as Ann Faraday, helped to take dream analysis out of the therapy room and popularize it by offering techniques anyone could use to analyze his or her own dreams". In addition, Faraday wrote for the Association for the Study of Dreams newsletter. Her books indicate that she also tried yoga and Zen-like activities, which were popular during that time period. Faraday believed that by placing too little importance on dreams, our society contributes to the poor recall of dreams, which most people immediately forget upon awakening.

From the 1970s, she and her partner John Wren-Lewis (1924–2006) travelled extensively, particularly within United States, Malaysia and Thailand, before settling permanently in Sydney, Australia. She also had a daughter, Fiona.

== See also ==
- Dream diary
- Dream sharing
- John Wren-Lewis
