= Smorfia =

Italian dream-interpretation practice

The smorfia (smorfia means "grimace" in Italian) is a traditional Neapolitan practice used to interpret dreams as numbers from 1 to 90. According to superstition, betting on these numbers can lead to winning the lottery. Whilst originating in Naples, the Smorfia is used throughout Italy.

Whilst it has it has uncertain origins, its name is said to derive from the Greek god of dreams and sleep, Morpheus. Other theories state that its name comes from the Greek word "morphos", which means structure or form.

It may have origins in the Jewish mystical practice of Kabbalah, particularly through gematria. The Neapolitan definition of cabala, however, differs from the traditional meaning and refers to wider supernatural practices. The 16th century Kabbalist Israel Saruk is credited with influencing the Neapolitan's usage of the word cabala in relation to smorfia.

It originated as an oral tradition before being transcribed into books. These books often contain illustrations to accommodate the illiterate. Whilst the traditional Neapolitan smorfia only contains 90 dream interpretations, modern smorfia books often contain thousands.

== Culture ==
The smorfia is linked to the superstitious gambling culture of Italy. The numbers are often used in conversation as a euphemism for taboo topics, such as calling someone a 22 instead of a madman.

Due to the lottery being banned in Italy during religious holidays in the 18th century, many Neapolitan families decided to play at home, leading to the creation of tombola. Italian tombola uses the numbers 1 to 90, corresponding to the smorfia. The caller will often mention its symbols whilst drawing the numbers.

In his series of paintings "IX Mediterranean Seas" depicting nine cities across the Mediterranean, the Spanish painter Pedro Cano depicts Naples using the 90 symbols of the smorfia.

The comedy troupe La Smorfia, consisting of Lello Arena, Massimo Troisi and Enzo Decaro, derived its name from this practice.

== The traditional Neapolitan smorfia numbers ==
Nº	English	Napoletano	Metaphorical meaning
1	Italy	L'Italia	
2	Girl	'A criatura	
3	Cat	'A jatta	
4	Pig	'O puorco	
5	Hand	'A mano	
6	The one that looks towards the ground	Chella ca guarda 'nderra	The female sexual organ
7	Clay vase	'O vasetto	
8	Madonna	'A Madonna (pronunciato "Maronna")	
9	Offspring	'A figliata	
10	Beans	'E fasule	
11	Mice	'E surice	
12	Soldier	'E surdate	
13	Saint Anthony	Sant'Antuono	The day dedicated to the saint in the Calendar of Saints
14	Drunk	'O 'mbriaco	
15	Boy	'O guaglione	
16	Buttocks	'O culo	Fortune
17	Bad luck	'A disgrazzia	
18	Blood	'O sanghe	
19	Laughter	'A resata	
20	Party	'A festa	
21	Naked woman	'A femmena annuda (pronunciato "annura")	
22	Madman	'O pazzo	
23	Idiot	'O scemo	
24	Guards	'E Gguardie	
25	Christmas	Natale	
26	Saint Anne	Nanninella	The day dedicated to the saint in the Calendar of Saints
27	Chamber pot	'O càntaro	
28	Breasts	'E zizze	
29	The children's father	'O pate d ' ' e ccriature	Male sexual organ
30	The Lieutenant's balls	'E palle d ' ' o tenente	Testicles
31	Landlord	'O patrone 'e casa	
32	Eel	'O capitone	
33	Age of Christ	L'anne 'e Cristo	
34	Head	'A capa	
35	Small bird	L'auciello	
36	Castanets	'E castagnelle	
37	Monk	'O monaco	
38	Beatings	'E mazzate	
39	Hanging	'A funa 'nganna	
40	Boredom	'A paposcia	
41	Knife	'O curtiello	
42	Coffee	'O ccafè	
43	The woman on the balcony	Onna ô balcone	A woman who exposes herself
44	Prison	'E cancelle	
45	Good wine	'O vino bbuono	
46	Money	'E denare	
47	Deadman	'O muorto	
48	Deadman who speaks	'O muorto che pparla	
49	Meat	'O piezzo 'e carne	
50	Bread	'O ppane	
51	Garden	'O ciardino	
52	Mother	'A mamma	
53	Old man	'O viecchio	
54	Hat	'O cappiello	
55	Music	'A musica	
56	Falling	'A caduta	
57	Hunchback	'O scartellato	
58	Gift	'O paccotto	
59	Hair	'E pile	
60	Lament	'O lamiento	Complaining
61	Hunter	'O cacciatore	
62	Murdered deadman	'O muorto acciso	
63	Bride	'A sposa	
64	Tailcoat	'A sciammerìa	
65	Crying	'O chianto	
66	Two spinsters	'E ddoje zetelle	
67	The squid in the guitar	'O purpo into'â chitarra	Sexual intercourse
68	Cooked soup	'A zuppa cotta	
69	Upside down	sott'e 'ncoppa	
70	Palace	'O palazzo	
71	Shit man	L'ommo 'e mmerda	An evil or reprehensible person
72	Wonder	'A maraviglia	
73	Hospital	'O spitale	
74	Cave	'A rotta	
75	Pulcinella	Pulecenella	
76	Fountain	'A funtana	
77	Devil	'E diavulille	
78	Beautiful daughter	'A bella figliola	A prostitute
79	Thief	'O mariuolo	
80	Mouth	'A vocca	
81	Flowers	'E sciure	
82	Laid table	'A tavula 'mbandita	
83	Bad weather	'O maletiempo	
84	Church	'A chiesa	
85	Souls of purgatory	Ll'aneme d''o priatorio	
86	Shop	'A puteca	
87	Lice	'E perucchie	
88	Caciocavallo cheese	'E casecavalle	
89	Old woman	'A vecchia	
90	Fear	'A paura	
