= Microgame (company) =

Microgame S.p.A.
- Company type: joint-stock company
- Industry: Online gambling
- Founded: 1996; 30 years ago in Benevento, Italy
- Founder: Fabrizio D'Aloia
- Headquarters: Benevento, Italy
- Key people: Fabrizio D'Aloia (President & CEO); Massimiliano Casella (Marketing & Sales Director)
- Revenue: 248.67 mln € (2009)
- Net income: 11.76 mln € (2009)
- Website: www.microgame.it

Microgame S.p.A. is an Italian online gambling joint-stock company. The company operates both as an application service provider and developer of online platforms and integrated systems of service, and through the online community People's Poker Network, which is made of more than 130 online partners in all Italy and counts more than 1.5 million gaming accounts.

Microgame has around 30% of Italian online poker market (as of October 2010) and 27.1% of online sports betting market (9.4% of overall sports betting market, as of July 2010). Major shareholders in the company are private equity firms Monitor Clipper Partners and TPG Growth.

== History ==
Microgame has been founded in 1996 by Italian engineer Fabrizio D'Aloia. Company's main activity was web applications development.

In 1998, the company is along first movers in the online sports betting market, which at that time was just regulated. Subsequently, it became the first Italian service provider in the field, and expanded services furniture also in Kyrgyzstan, Russia, Georgia, Malta, Austria, and United Kingdom. Between 2006 and 2007 (in this year, Microgame became a joint-stock company), enters the online horse racing betting and online instant lotteries markets.

In 2008, Microgame expands its gaming services: in March, online version of several lotteries are released; in May, launches the new integrated platform for members of the Microgame's network; in July, is officially launched the People's Poker Network, followed a few months later by a new online gaming portal, after the regulation of online poker (September 2008).

In 2009, Microgame exceeded 1 billion euros in betting; revenues exceeded 248 million euros, producing a net income of 11 million euros. Microgame also established an online poker "pro" players team, the People's Poker Team Pro, launched a new platform for online blackjack and the first People's Network live event: the People's Poker Cruise (December 12–15, 2009), a Texas Hold'em tournament held on a cruise ship on the Civitavecchia–Barcelona route.

In 2010, Microgame launched another live tournament, the People's Poker Tour, made of four legs to be held in four different venues: Kranjska Gora, Slovenia (April 9–12, 2010); Budapest, Hungary (June 9–12, 2010); Budva, Montenegro (September 15–18, 2010); and Nova Gorica, Slovenia (November 29-December 5, 2010). More, also the new platform for online bingo is launched.

In September 2016 Microgame Group agreed to acquire Active Games and Intent Software, expanding its content aggregation and platform capabilities. Key partnerships have included a 2010 exclusive branding alliance with Caesars Interactive’s World Series of Poker for Italy, a 2012 live-casino deal with Evolution Gaming, and post 2020 content integrations with third-party studios such as Playnetic and 7777 gaming to broaden its game catalogue for Italian licensees.

== Legal issues and litigation ==
In January 2012 Microgame suspended concessionaire Scommettendo Srl and related skins from the People’s Poker network citing irregularities. On 25 June 2015 the parties announced a settlement of the dispute, with damages recognized to Scommettendo in relation to the disconnection from the national totalisator system.

== See also ==
- Online gambling in Italy
- World Series of Poker
