= Fabrizio D'Aloia =

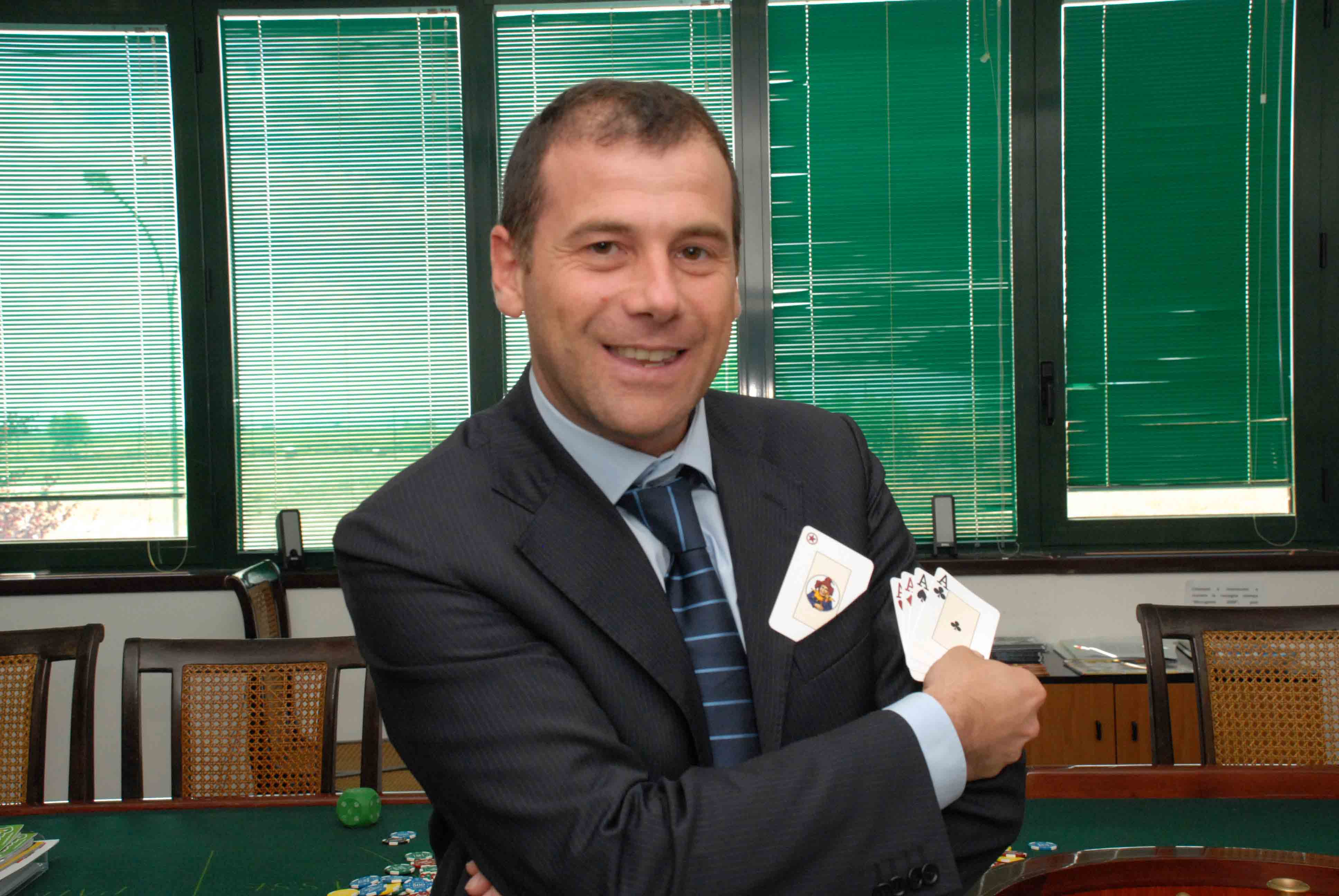
Fabrizio D'Aloia

Fabrizio D'Aloia (born February 17, 1964, in Benevento) is an Italian engineer, founder of Microgame.

In 1982, after completing high school, began working as a programmer for M.Data System. From 1984 to 1989, is a consultant for SIED Informatica, then for SOFT.Lab (1989–2006).

In 1993, he graduates in Electronic engineering, oriented to Computer science, at University of Naples Federico II. Subsequently, he got a master's degree in Information Technology at New York University.

In 1996, he founds Microgame. In December 2012 he resigned from CEO of Microgame, and in March 2013 he ceased to be Chairman. In 1999, wins Premio Marrama as one of the best young entrepreneurs in Campania. Microgame is now leader in online poker and online sports betting markets.
