= Metaphor and metonymy =

Forms of human discourse and cognition

Metaphor (drawing a similarity between two things) and metonymy (drawing a contiguity between two things) are two fundamental opposite poles along which a discourse with human language is developed. It has been argued that the two poles of similarity and contiguity are fundamental ones along which the human mind is structured; in the study of human language the two poles have been called metaphor and metonymy, while in the study of the unconscious they have been called condensation and displacement. In linguistics, they are connected to the paradigmatic and syntagmatic poles.

The couple metaphor-metonymy had a prominent role in the renewal of the field of rhetoric in the 1960s. In his 1956 essay, "The Metaphoric and Metonymic Poles", Roman Jakobson describes the couple as representing the possibilities of linguistic selection (metaphor) and combination (metonymy); Jakobson's work became important for such French structuralists as Claude Lévi-Strauss and Roland Barthes. In his essay, Jakobson also argues that metaphor is the basis for poetry, especially as seen in literary Romanticism and Symbolism, whereas metonymy forms the basis for Realism in literature.

For non-linguists, a metonym can be considered a low-imagination metaphor, an allusion via an actual property (or close approximation/association of) the concept being substituted (the too on-the-nose referent). E.g., writing by pen and violence by sword in the pen is mightier than the sword.

== Etymology ==
The English metaphor derived from the 16th-century Old French word métaphore, which comes from the Latin metaphora, "carrying over", in turn from the Greek μεταφορά (metaphorá), "transference", from μεταφέρω (metapherō), "to carry over", "to transfer" and that from μετά (meta), "after, with, across" + φέρω (pherō), "to bear", "to carry".

The words metonymy and metonym come from the Greek μετωνυμία, metōnymía, "a change of name", from μετά, metá, "after, beyond" (more precisely = "between", "inside"), and -ωνυμία, -ōnymía, a suffix that names figures of speech, from ὄνυμα, ónyma or ὄνομα, ónoma, "name".

== In the unconscious: condensation and displacement ==
According to Freud's work (1900), condensation and displacement (from German Verdichtung and Verschiebung) are two closely linked concepts. In the unconscious, through the dynamic movement of cathexis (charge of libido, mental or emotional energy), it is possible that an idea (image, memory, or thought) passes on its whole charge to another idea; Freud called this process "displacement." It is also possible that a single idea takes the whole charge of more than one other ideas; Freud called this process "condensation." In other words, a condensation is when more than one displacement occurs towards the same idea.

In 1957, Jacques Lacan, inspired by an article by linguist Roman Jakobson, argued that the unconscious has the same structure of a language, and that condensation and displacement are equivalent to the poetic functions of metaphor and metonymy.
