= Recurring dream =

Dream which is experienced repeatedly over a long period

A recurring dream is a dream which is experienced repeatedly over a long period. They can be pleasant or nightmarish and unique to the person and their experiences.

== Common themes in recurring dreams ==
Through psychological analyses and studies, some recurrent themes have been identified. These include dreaming of being chased and pursued, which has been repeatedly demonstrated as being the most frequently experienced recurrent theme. The following themes below have been found to contribute to more than half of recurring dreams:

- Difficulties with house maintenance
- Teeth falling out – Sigmund Freud believed that if a woman had a recurring dream of her teeth falling out that she unconsciously longed to have children, and that if a man had this dream he was afraid of castration. Neither of these claims is substantiated. Instead, research has found a significant connection between dreams of teeth falling out and physical dental irritation, challenging the idea that these dreams are purely symbolic of psychological distress.
- Discovering new rooms in a house – Freud believed that houses represented bodies. Others thought finding new rooms represented the dreamer finding out new things about themselves or of their own potential.
- Losing control of a vehicle
- Being unable to find a toilet
- Having the ability to fly

The subjects of recurring dreams do vary. The following examples are also common:

- Being held down or otherwise unable to move (compare sleep paralysis)
- Nakedness in a public place
- Being held back in school or failing a test or exam you didn't know about
- Losing the ability to speak
- Escaping or being caught in a tornado/storm
- Drowning, or otherwise not being able to breathe
- Finding lost items
- Unable to turn on the lights in one's house
- Being with a significant other
- Missing a bus, taxi, plane or train, and possibly attempting to chase it
- Having to return to an old school, college, and/or workplace, due to an unfinished assignment or other unresolved issues
- Being chased by an animal or murderer
- One's house catching on fire
- Falling from a very high place
- Nuclear attack
- Reliving traumatic experiences
- Seeing the same person and/or persons
- Certain persons promising to protect one especially from danger
- Unable to flush a toilet in one's house
- Anxiety over a traumatic experience
- Fear of missing an event or appointment
- Missing an event or appointment
- People, animals, and/or objects disappearing in clear view
- Visiting dead or lost relatives and/or friends
- Visiting a former crush, friend, and/or enemy
- Uncontrollable shaking and/or panic attack
- Past and/or possible future events
- Witnessing a crime
- Fear of leaving the house or going to a specific place
- Getting lost in one's own house or some other familiar place
- Relatives and/or friends dying or disappearing
- Event of a disaster
- Performing the same or similar routine
- Visiting the same or similar place
- Desire for a specific need or craving
- Sexual stimulation (sometimes)
- Other forms of stimulation
- Visiting or seeing recognizable people, animals, objects, buildings, etc.
- Being alone
- Being in a helpless situation

== Psychological disorders associated with recurring dreams ==
- Post-traumatic stress disorder: People suffering from post-traumatic stress disorder can often suffer from recurring dreams. These dreams are thought of as chronic nightmares that act as a symptom of PTSD. A study found that the degree of trauma had a positive relationship to distress related to dreams.
- Anxiety: Evidence suggests that recurrent dreams occur during times of stress and once the problem has resolved they will cease to recur.
- Obsessive compulsive disorder
- Epilepsy

== Possible explanations for recurring dreams ==
A theory of threat simulation theory was proposed by Antti Revonsuo and states the biological function of dreaming is to simulate threatening events and then rehearse threatening avoidance behaviors. However, this theory has had a mixed reception. Zadra et el. found in a study on this theory that 66% of recurrent dreams contained at least one threat. For the most part, these threats involved danger and were aimed at the dreamer themselves. In contrast however, they also found that less than 15% of recurrent dreams involved realistic situations that could prove critical to one's survival. They also found that the dreamer usually did not succeed at fleeing the threat. These provide mixed support for the theory originally proposed by Revonsuo.

Gestaltist dream theory views recurrent dreams as representing the person's current state of psychic imbalance. By bringing this imbalance to consciousness through the recurrent dream, it is possible for the person to restore their self-balance.

Freud believed that recurrent traumatic dreams showed expressions of neurotic repetitive compulsions.

Jung believed that recurrent dreams played an important role in the integration of the psyche.

Culturalist dream theory, brought to light by Bonime in 1962, holds that recurrent dreams represent that it will most certainly come true, without a lack of positive change or development in a person's personality.

Lucid dream theory holds that some people dream in recurrent form and it is a normal phenomenon.

== Treatment methods for recurring dreams ==
Practicing relaxation techniques and imagery exercises before going to sleep is a popular treatment suggestion. By imagining the dream and an intentional task to be carried out during the dream, the person will remember to carry out that task when they are actually dreaming. Then, when it occurs in the dream it will act as a prerehearsal cue in order to remind the person that they are dreaming, where they then can interact with the dream imagery. Once this is achieved, they can consult with their therapist for the best way to modify their recurrent dream to make it less traumatizing. There are several different proposals suggested to go about doing this.

In a 1974 work, Patricia Garfield suggests confronting and conquering the feared scene. A 1982 study by Halliday suggested altering a small aspect of the dream A 1988 study by Paul Tholey recommended having the dream ego engage in conciliatory dialogue with hostile dream figures.

== See also ==
- Dream dictionary
- Dream interpretation
- Psychoanalytic dream interpretation
- Relaxation technique
