= John Wren-Lewis =

Mathematician and psychologist

John Wren-Lewis (1923 – 25 June 2006) was a British-born scientist who taught at universities in Great Britain and the United States of America. He became known for his publications ranging over the fields of science, psychology, education and religion. He played a leading part in the so-called "Death of God" movement in Britain. Bishop John Robinson cites him as a key influence in the writing of 'Honest to God' in 1963. Wren-Lweis' 'conversion' to a rational/humanist Anglicanism is described in a collection called 'They Became Anglicans' (1959). In later life, after a traumatic near-death experience in Thailand in 1983, he wrote and taught about the meaning of mysticism and a broad spectrum of spiritual teachings.

== Life ==
Wren-Lewis graduated in applied mathematics from the Imperial College of Science, University of London. In the 1950s and 1960s, while working as industrial research executive with Imperial Chemical Industries, he became known for his publications as scholar, author and lecturer on topics of science, psychology, education and religion.

As of 1970 he was president of the British Association for Humanistic Psychology, which later became the European Association for Humanistic Psychology.

Participating in the Regents' Lectureship Program in the UC Santa Barbara in 1971–1972, he moved to the United States in 1972 with his life partner, the dream psychologist Ann Faraday. In 1972 he joined New College of Florida in Sarasota as visiting professor of religious studies and member of the faculty until 1974. Faraday and Lewis worked with the Esalen Institute since 1976. He has taught at universities in Great Britain and the United States of America.

=== Travel to Asia and near-death experience ===
John and Ann left the US to undertake three years of extended travel to India and East Asia.

They spent the year 1982 together in Malaysia. Earlier, in her publications relating to dream theory, Ann Faraday had cited writings of Kilton Stewart, who had seen great potential in what he had called "Senoi dream theory", and similarly Patricia Garfield referred to techniques of the Senoi when describing her work on dreams. However, Faraday and Wren-Lewis did not find any evidence supporting the use of dream control education in local culture.

In 1983, travelling with Ann, he was nearly poisoned to death in Thailand in the course of an attempt of robbery and underwent a near-death experience which profoundly changed his world view, and which has since been cited as a well-known example of experience of transcendent consciousness. Having been a convinced sceptic up to that point, he changed perspective. He said of the movie Fearless by Peter Weir that it conveyed "the actual feeling of a dimension beyond the life of space and time". He has described his changed view of perception in the words:

What I perceive with my eyes and other senses is a whole world that seems to be coming fresh-minted into existence moment by moment.

=== Australia and death ===
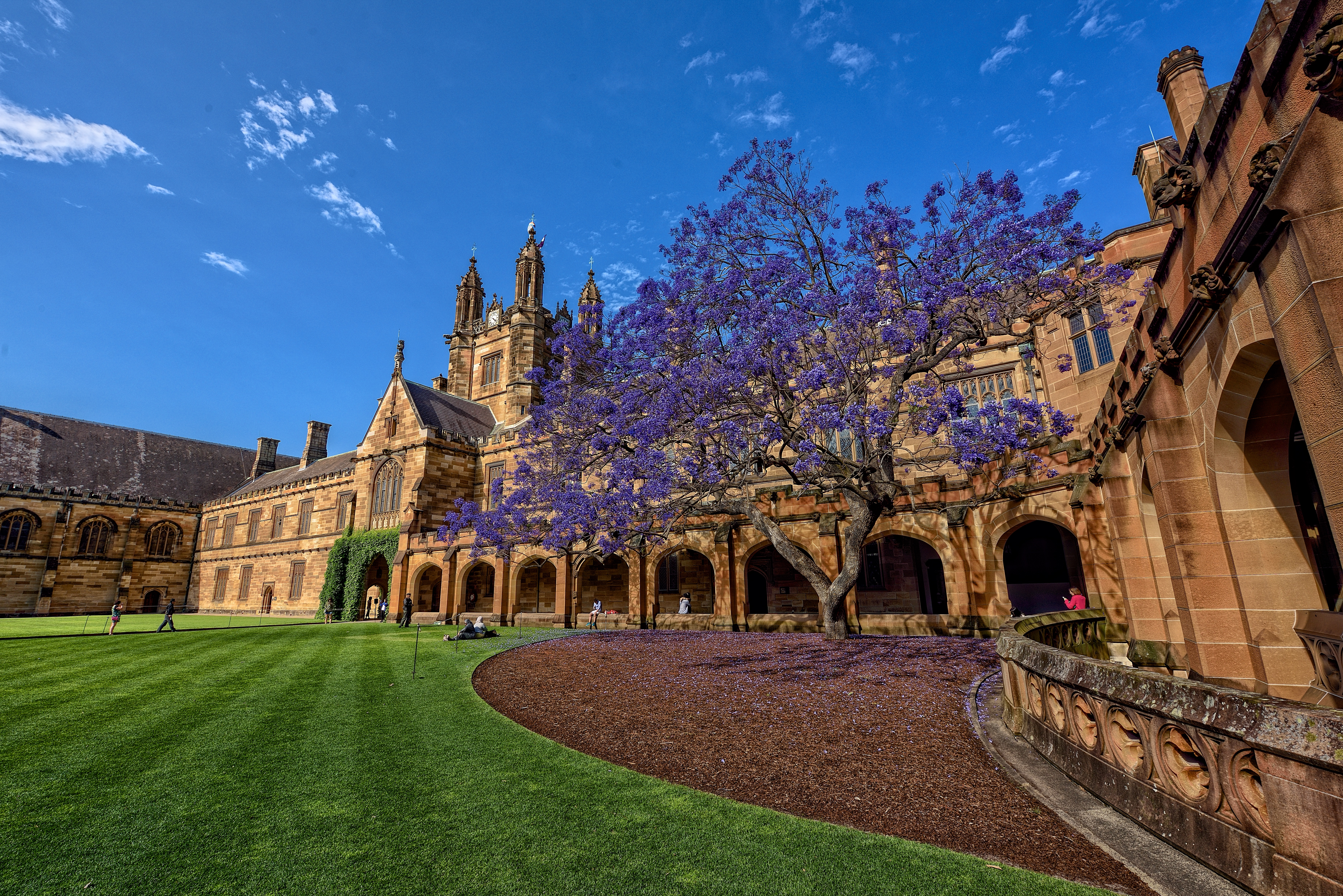
University of Sydney

In 1984 the couple moved to Australia. He later said of himself that at that moment he was "still reeling" from his experience of a year before. He became honorary associate at the Faculty of Religious Studies at the University of Sydney.

He and Ann Faraday together wrote a book The 9:15 to Nirvana about his near-death experience.

As recorded in the Ryerson Index, he died on 25 June 2006 at Shoalhaven, New South Wales, aged 82 years.

== Views ==
After his near-death experience, Wren-Lewis was no longer a sceptic of mysticism as such, yet remained critical of endeavours aimed at attaining personal growth and spiritual awakening by following existing paths of practice, in particular when undertaken with the aid of a guru. His change in viewpoint was reflected in his later work:

I know from firsthand experience that the "joy beyond joy" is greater than the wildest imaginations of a consciousness bogged down in time. But I can also see that the very impulse to seek the joy of eternity is a Catch-22, because seeking itself implies a preoccupation with time, which is precisely what drives eternity out of awareness. […] So what to do? One thing I learned in my former profession of science was that the right kind of lateral thinking can often bring liberation from Catch-22 situations, provided the Catch-22 is faced in its full starkness, without evasions in the form of metaphysical speculations beyond experience. This is the exploration to which my life is now dedicated.:

The psychologist Imants Barušs has interpreted this as a notion of a pre-physical substrate with similarity to the implicate order, as it has been postulated by theoretical physicists David Bohm and Basil Hiley.

In his book review of Ken Wilber's book Grace and Grit: Sprirituality and Healing in the Life and Death of Treya Killam Wilber, he wrote:

My conviction, which I share with Jean Houston and many others, is that the human race is entering a new phase, a new dispensation if you will, wherein we can develop a more truly empirical mysticism than has ever existed in the dogma-dominated cultures of the past.

== See also ==
- Ann Faraday

== Publications ==
Books

- John Wren-Lewis: What shall we tell the children?, Constable (London), 1971, ISBN 0-09-456050-1
- Charles Rycroft, Geoffrey Gorer, Anthony Storr, John Wren-Lewis, Peter Lomas: Psychoanalysis Observed, Edited with an introduction by Charles Rycroft, Coward-McCann, 1967 – Book Review
- C.F.D. Moule, John Wren-Lewis, D.A. Pond, P.R. Baelz: Faith, Fact and Fantasy, Westminster Press, 1966

Articles

- John Wren-Lewis: The implications of Near-Death Experiences for Understanding Post-Traumatic Growth, Psychological Inquiry, vol. 15 no. 1, 2004
- John Wren-Lewis: A Terrible Beauty: Reflections on Love and the Near-Death Experience. First appeared in IONS Review No. 54, December 2000 – February 2001, pp. 16–19 (now published under the name Shift–At the Frontiers of Consciousness)
- John Wren-Lewis: On Babies and Bathwater: A Non-Ideological Alternative to Mahner/Bunge Proposals for Relating Science and Religion in Education, Science and Education, Kluwer Academic Publishers, 1996, pp. 185–188, abstract
- John Wren-Lewis: Death Knell of the Guru System? Perfectionism Versus Enlightenment, Journal of Humanistic Psychology Spring 1994, vol. 34 no. 2, pp. 46–61, doi:10.1177/00221678940342004, abstract
- John Wren-Lewis: Aftereffects of near-death experiences: A survival mechanism hypothesis, Journal of Transpersonal Psychology vol. 26 no. 2, 1994, pp. 107–115, abstract
- John Wren-Lewis: Avoiding the Columbus Confusion: An Ockhamish View of Near-Death Research, Guest Editorial, Springer, Journal of Near-Death Studies, 1992, vol. 11 no. 2, pp. 75–81, doi:10.1007/BF01074300, abstract
- John Wren-Lewis: The Darkness of God. A Personal Report on Consciousness Transformation Through an Encounter with Death, Journal of Humanistic Psychology Spring 1988, vol. 28 no. 2 pp. 105–122, doi:10.1177/0022167888282011, abstract (and excerpt in German translation)
- John Wren-Lewis: Resistance to the study of the paranormal, Journal of Humanistic Psychology vol. 14 no. 2, Springer 1974, pp. 41–48, doi:10.1177/002216787401400205, abstract
- John Wren-Lewis: Faith in the technological future, Futures, vol. 2 no. 3, September 1970, pp. 258–262
- John Wren-Lewis: The Passing of Puritanism I, Critical Quarterly, vol. 5 no. 4, pp. 295–306, December 1963 (Article first published online: 28 September 2007, doi:10.1111/j.1467-8705.1963.tb01196.x) abstract
