= Psychoanalytic dream interpretation =

Dream interpretation by psychoanalysis

Psychoanalytic dream interpretation is a subdivision of dream interpretation as well as a subdivision of psychoanalysis pioneered by Sigmund Freud in the early 20th century. Psychoanalytic dream interpretation is the process of explaining the meaning of the way the unconscious thoughts and emotions are processed in the mind during sleep.

There have been a number of methods used in psychoanalytic dream interpretation, including Freud's method of dream interpretation, the symbolic method, and the decoding method. The Freudian method is the most prominently used in psychoanalysis and has been for the last century. Psychoanalytic dream interpretation is used mainly for therapeutic purposes in a variety of settings. Although these theories are used, none have been solidly proven and much has been left open to debate among researchers. Some studies have shown that areas of dream interpretation can be invalid and therefore a decline in importance has been seen in psychoanalytic dream interpretation.

== Freudian theory ==
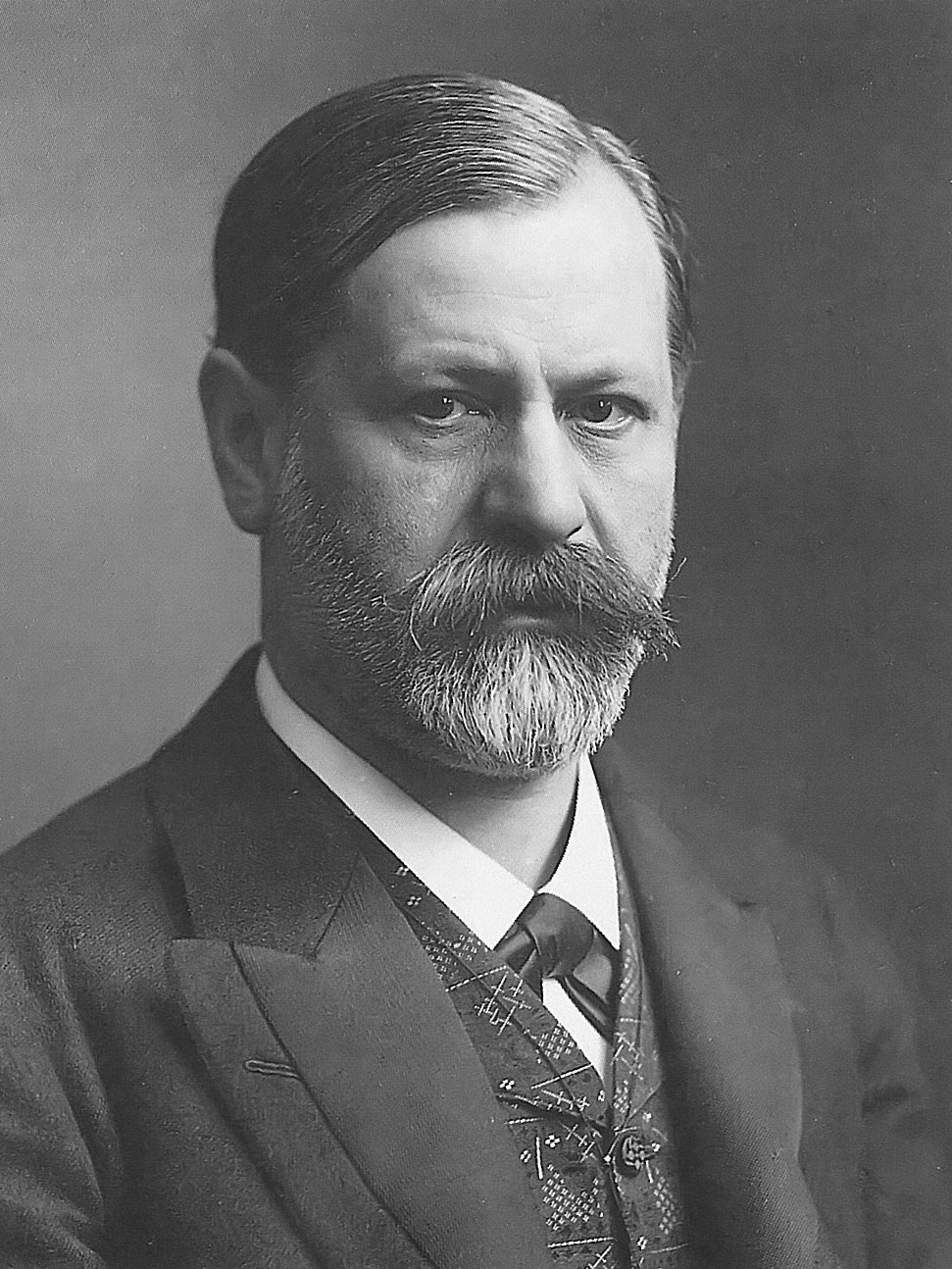
Sigmund Freud circa 1905.

Freud believed dreams represented a disguised fulfilment of a repressed wish. He believed that studying dreams provided the easiest road to understanding of the unconscious activities of the mind. His theories state that dreams have two parts: a manifested content, which is the remembered dream after we wake, and a latent content, or the dream that we do not remember which is considered part of the unconscious. He proposed that the latent, or unremembered, dream content is composed of three elements: the sensory impressions during the night of the dream, the residues left from the day before, and the id's drives that are already part of the dreamer.

Freud believed that the repression by the super-ego is weakened during sleep due to the absence of voluntary motor activity. This creates an increased possibility of subconscious impulses from the id reaching consciousness. According to the idea that Freud proposed, the dream is considered the guardian of sleep. Dreams allow a gratification of certain drives through a visual fantasy, or the manifest content. This reduces the impact of these drives from the id, which might often cause the dreamer to wake in order to fulfil them. In layman's terms, dreams allow certain needs to be fulfilled without the conscious mind needing to be aware of such fulfilment. However, the manifest content is not comprehensive, because it consists of a distorted version of the latent content.

At the beginning of the psychoanalytic movement, Freud and his followers considered dreams to be the main tool of self-analysis, as well as a prominent part of the treatment. Dream understanding and interpretation during that time was influenced heavily by Freud's drive-conflict theory. The therapy was designed to reveal the latent content of the patient's repressed sexuality and unconscious mind. To understand the dream, the therapist had to explore the latent content of the dream via the process of free association.

== Other theoretical frameworks ==
The symbolic method held that dreams had to be considered in their entirety, and therefore are unified in their meanings. This gave way to very narrow interpretations. Individual events in the dreams did not matter, only the dream as a whole could properly represent the message. The method often was considered artful. Practitioners even went so far as to say that in order to properly interpret dreams, one needed to have a talent or gift at the method. Since the practice relied too much on a broad meaning and had relatively few people who were considered able to interpret, it was eventually dismissed on Freud.

The decoding method considered events and objects in dreams as symbols, which are translated into broader symbols using a key as a guide. The narrower view presents many challenges. No universal key exists, leaving symbols to mean different things to different interpreters. The method also only concentrates on the dreams themselves, disregarding the patients' waking lives. Also considered arbitrary and imprecise, Freud dismissed the decoding method as well.

Robert Langs (1928-2014) developed a revised version of psychoanalytic psychotherapy known as the "adaptive paradigm". This is a distinctive model of the mind, and particularly of the mind's unconscious component, significantly different from other forms of psychoanalytic and psychodynamic psychotherapy. Langs sees the unconscious mind as an adaptive entity functioning outside of direct awareness.

Because the conscious mind finds death-related traumas and stresses unbearable, it tends to deny the anxiety-provoking meaning of traumatic events but thereby also loses the potential wisdom that the traumatic experience might confer. According to Langs, the conscious mind thereby adapts, by surviving the event that seemed unbearable, but simultaneously fails to adapt, by leaving unconscious what it might have gained from the experience. Thus an important goal of adaptive therapy is to access the wisdom of the unconscious mind, which is denied at the conscious level due to the pain and anxiety associated with the traumatic event.

According to Langs, the activities of unconscious processing reach the conscious mind solely through the encoded messages that are conveyed in narrative communications like dreams. He maintains that, as a rule, dreams are responses to current traumas and adaptive challenges and that their story lines characteristically convey two sets of meanings: the first expressed directly as the story qua story, while the second is expressed in code and implicitly, disguised in the story's images. We can tap into our unconscious wisdom by properly decoding our dreams, i.e. by linking the dream to the traumas that have evoked them—a process Langs calls "trigger decoding". This process, according to Langs, is the essence of self-healing based on deep insight.

== Contemporary psychoanalytic approach ==
The developments in the field of classical psychoanalysis in which the ego psychology gradually replaced the id psychology affected greatly the clinical psychoanalytical practice. One of the main characteristics of the modern psychoanalytic approach is the change in the emphasis that Freud put in the oedipal phase and in the exploration of the unconscious, towards the investigation of ego, ego defenses and the pre-oedipal phases of developments. This change is also reflected in the recent advances toward the understanding of dreams. Although modern analysts base their understanding of the dreams on many of Freud's discoveries, they believe that Freud, in focusing on oedipal conflicts, failed to pay adequate attention to the examination of the emotional experiences during the first three years of life. Furthermore, they conclude that these experiences often provide the impetus for the creation of a dream. The emphasis on the ego defenses and the degradation of the importance of the unconscious led to further consequences for the interpretation of dreams. The importance of the latent content of the dream in the clinical practice was shifted toward the manifest content of dreams.

In contrast to Freud's idea that the latent content of the dream can be revealed by the implementation of free association, contemporary analysts believe that the unconscious or hidden meaning of the dream is not discovered from the patient's associations to the dream material. According to them these associations are an additional defense, a disguise against the patient's primitive conflicts, and reveals only what the dreamer consciously feels or thinks about the dream. Additionally, in modern psychoanalysis dreams are a valuable instrument for examining proverbial conflicts. Disagreeing with Freud's view that the true meaning of a dream derives from its latent content, contemporary analysts are convinced that "what one sees in the dream is the dream".

Modern analysts use the manifest content to understand the patient's unconscious. They attempt to understand the symbolism of the manifest content of the dream in relation to the total content of the session. During a session in which a patient describes a dream, everything that patient says and does after entering the therapist's office is considered an association to the dream and is used to untie its manifest content. The representatives of the modern psychoanalytic school are convinced that the patient's genetic history and unresolved conflicts are revealed in the transference and are symbolized in the patient's dreams. Because the patient is reporting the dream to the analyst, analysts believe that it is an indirect communication to the analyst about a major transference feeling. The modern psychoanalytic view underlined the importance of dreams in the analysis of transference and counter-transference. Dreams are viewed as representations of the psychoanalytic relationship and reflect transference counter-transference issues. This feature is very prominent in the approach adopted from the interpersonal school of psychology.

Modern analysts reckon the dream as a result of the whole personality and believe that it reveals much about the patient's entire personality structure. Rather than apply dreams, as Freud had, to discover what the patient is hiding, modern analysts should use dreams to understand why the patient is hiding and why certain ways are being used to hide. If these character resistances are effectively analyzed, then the basic quality of the patient's dreams should alter significantly; they should become clearer and less disguised.

== Content and continuity ==
Dreaming can be defined as "a sequence of perceptions, thoughts and emotions during sleep that is experienced as a series of actual events. The nature of these events, the dream content, can be known to the interviewers only in the form of a verbal or written report." Dream content seems to be evolved simultaneously with cognitive and emotional development during childhood. However, when adulthood is reached, only few differences emerge concerning the dream content. The most apparent variability in dream content seems to deal with the emergence of aggression, which additionally diverges greatly due to age, as it has been demonstrated through a majority of studies. Despite the originality and creativity that is exhibited in the cognitive construction of dreams, and even given the aspects of dream content that are not understood, most dreams are more realistic and based on everyday life than is proposed by previous traditional dream theories. Furthermore, much dream content seems more evident than might be expected when reviewing clinical theories which emphasize disguise and/or symbolism in understanding dreams.

Ernest Hartmann was one of the theorists that envisioned dreams as contextualizing the dominant emotion, expressing it through a pictorial representation. This pattern is found most clearly in dreams of people that are experiencing an intense emotion (such as in general stressful situations) and not major traumas. Even if there is no dominant emotion, and several lower intensity emotions are present, such pattern, although less clear, is still present. Thus, Hartmann and his collaborators have published numerous studies demonstrating the importance of emotion in dreams, and demonstrating that the power of the central image of the dream is related to the power of the underlying emotion.

More recent developments suggest that dreams are more similar than different because they dramatize people's conceptions and concerns in relation to personal issues, which probably does not vary much from country to country as culture does. In particular, the continuity hypothesis postulates that the content of everyday dreams reflects the dreamer's waking states and concerns. In other words, elements from people's dreams can be related to corresponding waking or psychological variables. Research findings have revealed that the occurrence of recurrent dreams, nightmares and unpleasant everyday dreams is related to one's psychological well-being. Further data demonstrates that the dream reports of people suffering from certain psychopathologies can differ from those of normal control subjects (Kramer, 2000; Schredl & Engelhardt, 2001), and that certain personality dimensions such as extroversion, neuroticism, and psychological boundaries are extensively associated to dream content.

In addition, dreams have considerable consistency across time and countries because they express personal interests, worries and emotional preoccupations about family, friends, social life, recreational interests, and relationships at work. Within the context of the emphasis on personal concerns, there are sometimes distortions in settings, sudden scene changes, or unusual aspects to familiar characters, but dreams are in general a reasonable simulation of the dreamer's conception of his waking reality in terms of characters, social interactions, activities and settings.

== Implications in therapy ==
Clinical observation has revealed the importance of using dream interpretation in psychotherapy. In particular, three types of gains are described as a result of dream interpretation. Insight is the first asset gained by the clinical use of dreams for both the therapist and the client. Insight is conceptualized as containing four elements:metaphorical vision with the intention of seeing oneself in a totally new perspective, connection with the aim of linking different aspects of one's experience, suddenness, which is described as an affect display of surprise, and newness, which means the profound exploration of one's psychic world.

The second gain is the increased involvement of the client in the therapeutic process. Dream work can facilitate and provide access to a client's most essential issues. Therefore, dream interpretation can be beneficial in building a therapeutic relationship, even in a distrustful patient. Building a trustful relationship with the client can enhance his/her active involvement in the therapeutic process. At length, a better understanding of the client's dynamics and clinical progress is one of the most essential gains that have been revealed in many clinical reports. Interpretive dream work can provide clinicians better access to their client's cognitive schemas. This is because the dream content can reflect the evolution of the client's self-concept, defense mechanisms, core conflicts and at last transfer reactions.

The third gain is that dreams' pleasant or unpleasant content has a vital function in dream interpretation. Empirical studies suggest that dream pleasantness leads to higher levels of hope and openness towards conflict resolution, whereas unpleasant dreams have a negative impact on clients' progress, as the dreamer may focus on impending threats and therefore lead to unresolved conflicts. Importance of the use of the dreams in therapy has been tested throughout the years by some empirical studies. It has been found that understanding a disturbing persistent dream can reduce its occurrence and its associated distress.

Freud believed that the therapist's role contributed a lot in dream work's efficacy. Freud stated that the dream interpreters were no different from other scientists because their ability to interpret dreams is a skill that requires experience and knowledge of the subject. In recent decades authors and psychologists have begun to disagree with parts of Freud's theory. M. Freeman states that the interpretation of dreams must involve some fabrication of the client's dreams. Contemporary therapists are beginning to think that dream interpretation may involve unconscious thought of the client but it also may involve creation of meaning from the therapist. Therapeutic work done on dreams is used in practices such as family therapy, group therapy, Gestalt therapy, psychodrama, client-centered therapy, and cognitive-behavioral therapy. The majority of therapists that use dream interpretation in therapy are psychotherapists.

The psychoanalysts that use dream interpretation most often will use the Freudian dream theory. If there are other therapists, such as humanistic and cognitive-behavior therapists, that use dream interpretation in therapy; they are more likely to use a different method than the Freudian dream theory a majority of the time. The majority of psychotherapists have distanced themselves from using dream interpretation in therapy. The psychoanalysts that still use dream work in therapy find benefits in working with dreams with their clients. One benefit is success in the treatment of their patients when using dream interpretation. Therapists that use dream interpretation who also show compassion and are facilitating to the client show even greater results and benefits with their clients than just dream interpretation alone.

== Decline in use ==
According to Freud dream interpretation was supposed to be guided by patients through free associations to various aspects of the dream, thus leaving room for the interpretation to be tailored to individuals. Freud noted and warned readers that the psychological meaning of objects, people, or events in dreams were not meant to be universal. This was a rule that Freud himself even came close to breaking by generalizing that penetration into tight spaces and opening locked doors commonly symbolized sexual activity and that hair cutting, loss of teeth, and beheading frequently symbolized castration. Due to the lack of universality in the meaning behind different symbolism in dreams this has left dream interpretation to be up to the practitioner. This alone causes questions as to the validity of this approach to therapy due to the lack of a standard/baseline. Moreover, researchers have found that many dreams do not even appear to be distinguished symbols, rather they mirror everyday life activities and concerns that occupy our minds such as studying, shopping, going to work etc.

Studies done by Brenner (1969) and Waldhorn (1967) have downgraded Freud's classical view of dreams from extremely important to being on a level playing field with other psychological phenomena. Developments in REM research (Ellman and Antrobus, 1991) have also played a part in diminishing dreams importance in both clinical and theoretical psychoanalysis. For psychoanalysts dreams can present a challenge as their interpretation often can overwhelm other aspects of a patient's problem and take up much of the time spent on the patient, and in many cases interpretations served the interpreter and not the patient. Dream discussion has taken a back seat to the discussion of daily life and the here and now.

Dreams are also difficult to remember, with no more than 5% to 10% of dreams being remembered the following day. The parts of the dream that are retained the next day likely dissipate overnight. However, dreams are not all negative and can have much to say about daily life. Broader possibilities for dreams can be presented by stressing their social aspect. Through this method dreams have a different, but equally important, hold on psychoanalysis.

Furthermore, it was found in a study conducted by Mazzoni et al. (1999) that a clinician can have a stronger influence than most believe. In this study they found that people were more suggestible in a simulation that bears a resemblance to a clinical setting. This means that if a therapists suggested that a dream could represent some form of abuse in the past, that they would be more likely to believe that it happened whether or not it happened. This has dangerous implications for dream interpretation in a clinical setting as it can implant false memories in people's minds.

== Common arguments for and against this process ==
There are many issues that current psychologists have with psychoanalysis and therefore with its form of dream interpretation. Psychoanalysis is a theory that is not easily testable. Because the drive behind psychoanalysis is looking at a person's subconscious, there is not an accurate way to measure this scientifically. Freud even admitted in "On Narcissism", published in 1914, that the ideas of psychoanalysis are not the foundation of science. This all holds true with this form of dream interpretation. The word "interpretation" itself leads to questions for how to measure accuracy because everyone has different ways of interpretation.

One popular theory as to the reasoning behind dreams is Hobson's activation–synthesis theory. This theory states that while sleeping we cycle through REM (rapid eye movement) periods about every 90 minutes. During these periods various neurotransmitters fire off, causing dreams. This theory specifically focuses on an increase of acetylcholine, which increases the activity in the emotional centers of the brain, meanwhile decreases in serotonin and norepinephrine work to decrease activity in areas of the brain that control reason, memory, and attention. This means that any dreams presented during REM periods of sleep are our brains' best attempts at making sense of the randomness of information presented. Thus, trying to interpret these dreams is akin to trying to make sense out of random gibberish.

Even though there are many arguments against the use of psychoanalytic dream interpretation and psychoanalysis in general, many psychoanalytic societies and institutes still exist. For example, the Boston Psychoanalytic Society and Institute Inc. still uses many forms of psychoanalysis, including the interpretation of dreams. For some supports, though, it is easy to become confused in all of the ideas of psychoanalysis and therefore have a hard time defending. This is part of what led to the decline of psychoanalysis and psychoanalytic dream interpretation.

G. William Domhoff and David Foulkes consider the idea that free association gives access to the latent content of the dream to have been invalidated by experimental psychology, concluding that the method is just arbitrary.

== Therapeutic applications ==
Psychoanalytic dream interpretation can be used in various therapeutic settings to help patients gain insight into their unconscious thoughts, emotions, and unresolved conflicts. Dream analysis allows patients to explore repressed memories and traumatic events that may be contributing to their current psychological distress.

Some specific therapeutic applications of dream interpretation include:

- Treating mental disorders such as depression and anxiety: Uncovering the root causes of disorders through dream analysis enables patients to address their issues and enhance their mental health.
- Enhancing self-discovery and personal growth: Interpreting dreams can help patients better understand themselves, their relationships, and their life experiences.
- Strengthening the therapeutic alliance: Dream interpretation provides opportunities for empathy, respect, and collaboration between the therapist and patient, thereby improving the therapeutic relationship.

Case studies and anecdotal evidence suggest that patients who engage in dream interpretation often report therapeutic benefits. However, more empirical research is needed to establish the effectiveness of this technique.

== Current research and future directions ==
While psychoanalytic dream interpretation has a long history, recent research has focused on integrating insights from cognitive psychology, neuroscience, and other related fields. Some current areas of research include:

- Studying the neurobiological basis of dreaming using advanced imaging techniques
- Exploring how dreams relate to memory consolidation, emotional regulation, and cognitive processing during sleep
- Investigating the role of dreams in creativity, problem-solving, and self-organization

Future research could also examine how modern psychoanalytic approaches view dreams as representations of the psychoanalytic relationship and transference/countertransference issues. Additionally, more rigorous empirical studies are needed to assess the efficacy of dream interpretation in various therapeutic contexts.

== See also ==
- DreamsID (Dreams interpreted and drawn)
- Recurring dream
