= Gambling in Italy =

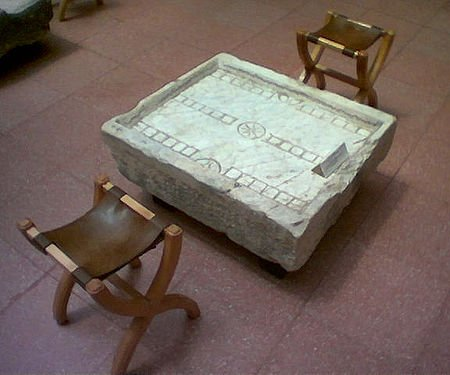
A Ludus Duodecim Scriptorum, a board game popular during the Roman Empire

Gambling in Italy has existed for centuries and has taken on many forms. Its dates back to the days of the Roman Empire, when the predecessor of the modern game of backgammon, Ludus Duodecim Scriptorum, became popular among Roman legionnaires. It is also due to them that the game came to other European countries.

The first gambling house, "Ridotto", was opened in Venice in 1638 (388 years ago). It was sanctioned by the government aiming to control gambling activity of the citizens. Although admission to the gambling house was free, only rich people could afford to play there, because the stakes were high. The games played were biribi, resembling a modern lottery, and bassetta. Both games had a very high house edge. In 1774, "Ridotto" was closed, resulting in the growth of popularity of the closed gambling clubs. These clubs were called 'casinos', and the word casino itself is of Italian origin.

Baccarat originated in Italy in the 15th century, and bingo is also of Italian origin. In the 1530s, Italians played a game called 'Lo Giuoco del Lotto D'Italia', which resembled bingo.

== Gambling law ==
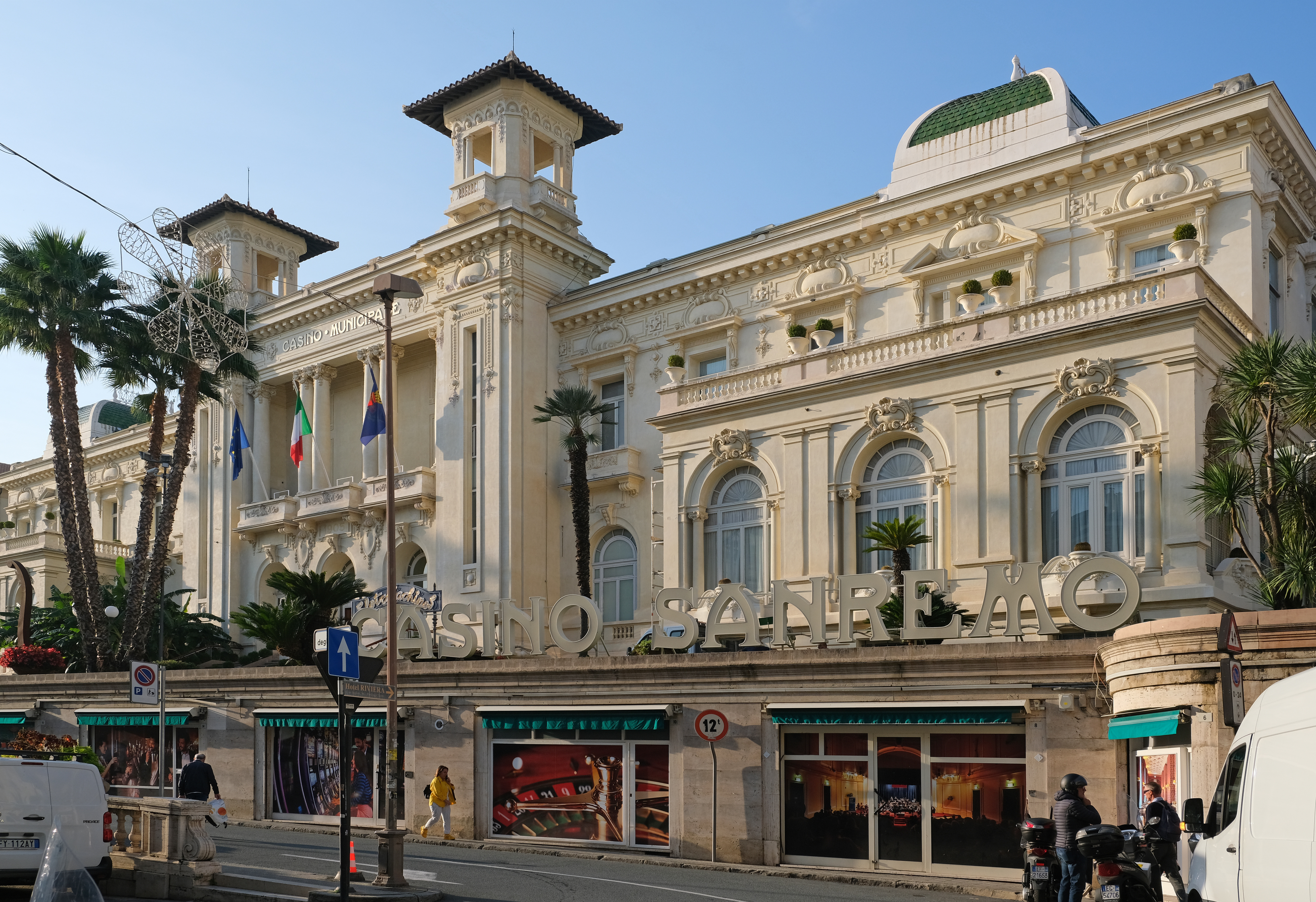
Sanremo Casino

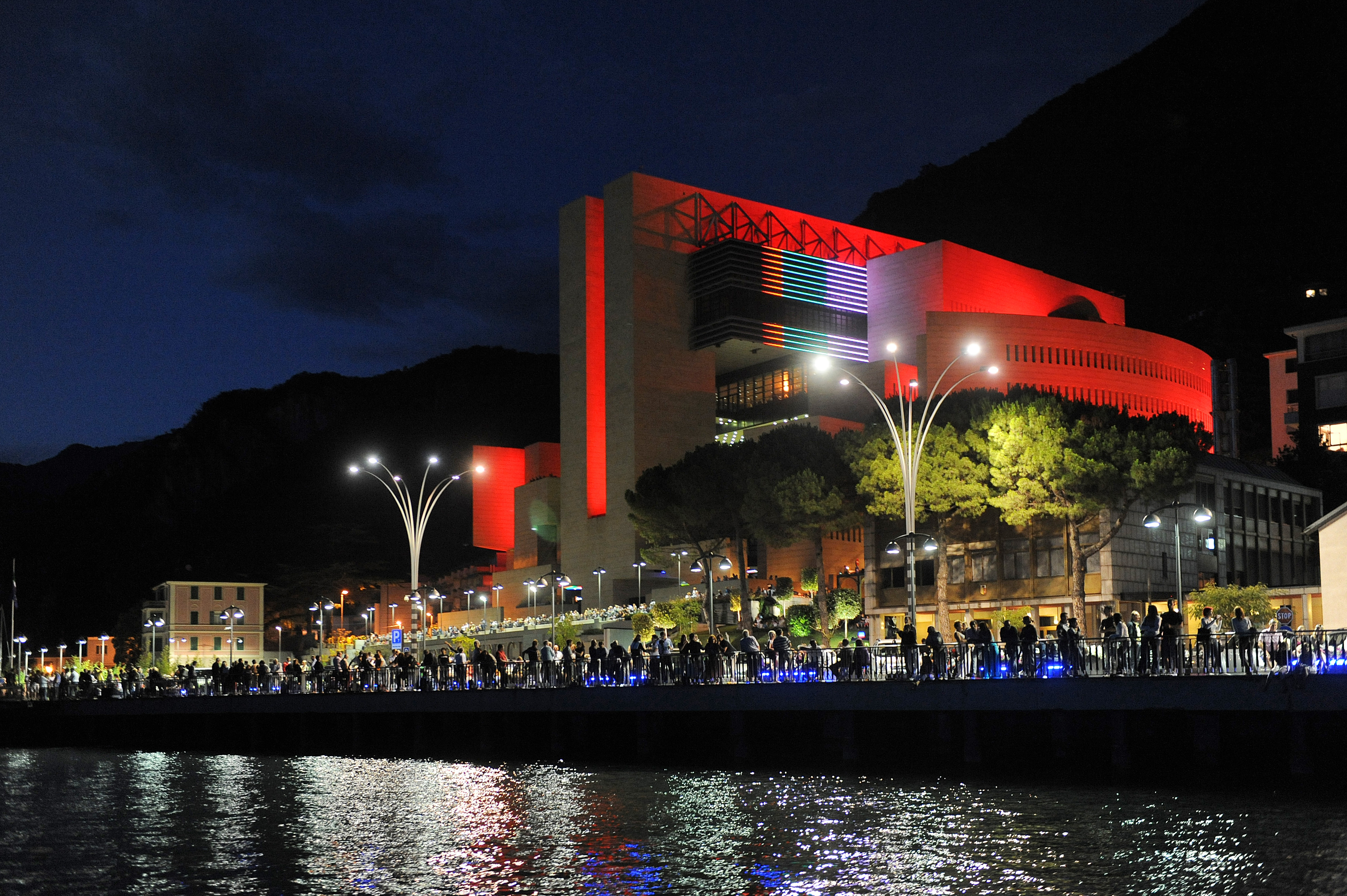
Casinò di Campione

According to Italian criminal law, gambling is illegal, be it organized in a public place or a private club. At the same time, there's a difference between games of luck and games where the outcome depends on the player's skill. Sports-betting, lotteries, and some other activities fall into the category of legal and regulated gambling activities.

Only the state has the right to allow gambling. ADM (Agenzia delle Dogane e dei Monopoli – "agency for gaming and monopolies") is granted the power to issue licenses and regulate other gambling matters. Punishment for breaking the law ranges from fines to imprisonment.

Italy has come a long way from totally prohibiting all gambling activities to legalizing some of them under certain conditions. The main reason why the Italian government has adhered to strict rules has been the desire to avoid the possible negative effects associated with the industry. The following amendments liberalized the market in 2006:

- Legalisation of real-money skill games and betting exchanges
- Opening of the Italian gambling market to operators from EU and EFTA countries (on condition they meet certain requirements)
- Opening of a new license tender that was supposed to rearrange the network of offline betting establishments and also providing possibilities for online gaming operators to offer their services on a legal basis.

The Finance Act of 2007 was another milestone in the regulation of gambling in Italy. It legalized card games of skill, specifying that such games should be played in the form of a tournament, with the stakes equal to the tournament entry fee. This automatically legalized Texas Hold'em poker. Other poker games, as well as video poker games based on the same rules, were prohibited as being dependent wholly on pure luck.

The "Comunitaria" decree (February 2011) was a real breakthrough for the gambling industry in Italy. It provided regulations for cash poker games and casino games and also anchored changes introduced in the previous version of the decree. One of its most notable aspects was the new tax regime based on profits rather than on the turnover. A flat rate of 20% was to be applied to all newly legalized games, except video lottery games. Operators organizing sports and horse betting, lotteries, and skill games still had to pay 3% of total tournament buy-ins sold.

Also, the new decree obliged operators to pay back to players at least 90% of wagered money in the form of winnings. The maximum buy-in for a poker tournament was set at €250 and the maximum initial stake for each gaming session could not exceed €1,000.

== Online gambling ==
Liberalization of the Italian online gambling market gradually started in 2006, when, following complaints received in 2003, the European Commission investigated the case and started infringement proceedings against Italy. The reason for such action was very stringent Italian legislation prohibiting even legitimate European gambling operators from offering their online services in Italy. Only the Italian National Olympic Committee (CONI) and the National Horse Breeders Enhancement Society (UNIRE) were allowed to arrange sports betting offline and online. Websites run by other operators were blocked, to prevent Italians from using them.

As of November 2006, the blacklist of websites that didn't have Italian licenses and should have been blocked, contained 621 websites (including sites run by operators licensed in other EU states). Since the Italian authorities didn't notify the EC about this list, the country violated EU Directive 98/34/EC (on provision of information in the field of technical standards and regulations). Also, when prohibiting the functioning of any foreign operators, Italian authorities referred to the criminal law. According to this law, organising a game of chance in a public place or a private club was forbidden and could result in imprisonment and monetary sanction. Such activities required a special license and police authorization. However, this approach was not compatible with the principles of the EEC Treaty concerning the freedom of establishment and the freedom to provide cross-border services (Articles 43 et seq. and 49).

After the EC brought infringement proceedings against Italy, in 2009, Italian authorities notified the Commission of amendments made to the gambling law.

Since March 2010, when the new law came into power, foreign gambling operators have been able to launch online real-money games. Before offering their services to Italian citizens, they were obligated to get an Italian license. AAMS (Amministrazione Autonoma dei Monopoli di Stato – Autonomous Administration of State Monopolies) is the Italian gaming authority that issues licenses. The licenses cover:

- skill games
- tournament and solitaire poker games
- cash poker games
- casino games
- fixed-odds and totalisator sports, horse and other events betting
- horse pools
- bingo

To qualify for an online gambling license, all operators must provide evidence that they meet certain requirements. These include financial, technical, social, and other aspects of the business. To be granted a license, the company has to:

- manage games in Europe with a turnover of no less than €1,500,000 in the last 2 years
- function at a high technical level, providing stable, secure, and easy-to-use services
- be incorporated as a limited company
- have reliable administration members
- have its official residence and technical support in one of the EU countries
- pay €350,000 to AAMS for technical management, administration, and supervision.

The number of licenses that can be issued by AAMS is limited to 120.

In July 2026, Italy's senate began considering a 2% tax on online betting revenues.

== Lottery ==
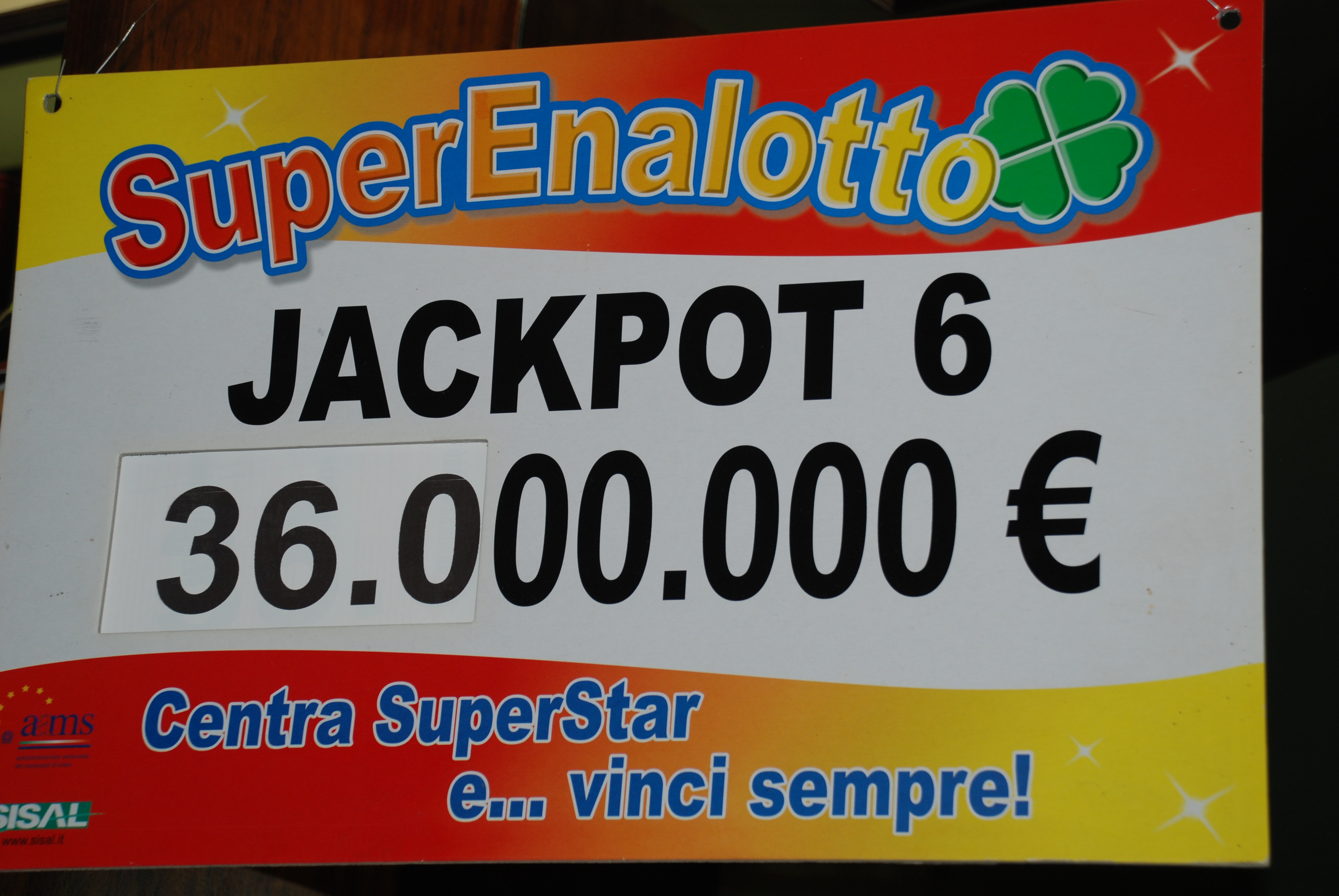
SuperEnalotto jackpot display board (July 2008)

SISAL holds the national SuperEnalotto, a lottery with one of the highest jackpots and one of the lowest odds in the world. There are other regional lotteries, some with centuries of history. The smorfia is a traditional method to pick numbers based on dreams, news events, or recommendations of "gifted" people.

== Initiatives against gambling ==
One of the initiatives to keep Italians from gambling is the school program BetOnMath, where three mathematicians try to demonstrate to school students how the gambling industry works. Some 250 math teachers already work with the program.

== List of casinos ==
- Casino Municipale di Campione d'Italia
- Casino Municipale di Sanremo
- Casino Municipale di Venezia (Summer Casino)
- Casino Municipale di Venezia (Winter Casino)
- Casino de la Vallee
