= Displacement (psychology) =

Unconscious defense mechanism (psychology)

In psychology, displacement (German: Verschiebung, lit. 'shift, move') is an unconscious defence mechanism whereby the mind substitutes either a new aim or a new object for things felt in their original form to be dangerous or unacceptable.

For instance, if an employer criticizes one of their employees at work, the employee might feel angry but cannot express it directly to their boss. Instead, when they get home, they take out their frustration by yelling at a family member or slamming a door. In this case, the family member or the door is a safer target for the employee's anger than the boss.

== Freud ==
The concept of displacement originated with Sigmund Freud. Initially he saw it as a means of dream-distortion, involving a shift of emphasis from important to unimportant elements, or the replacement of something by a mere illusion. Freud called this “displacement of accent.”

Displacement of object: Feelings that are connected with one person are displaced onto another person. A man who has had a bad day at the office, comes home and yells at his wife and children, is displacing his anger from the workplace onto his family. Freud thought that when children have animal phobias, they may be displacing fears of their parents onto an animal.

Displacement of attribution: A characteristic that one perceives in oneself but seems unacceptable is instead attributed to another person. This is essentially the mechanism of psychological projection; an aspect of the self is projected (displaced) onto someone else. Freud wrote that people commonly displace their own desires onto God’s will.

Bodily displacements: A genital sensation may be experienced in the mouth (displacement upward) or an oral sensation may be experienced in the genitals (displacement downward). Novelist John Cleland in Fanny Hill referred to the vagina as “the nethermouth.” Sexual attraction toward a human body can be displaced in sexual fetishism, sometimes onto a particular body part like the foot, or at other times onto an inanimate fetish object.

Freud also saw displacement as occurring in jokes, as well as in neuroses – the obsessional neurotic being especially prone to the technique of displacement onto the minute. When two or more displacements occur towards the same idea, the phenomenon is called condensation (from the German Verdichtung).

Phobia displacement or repression: Humans were able to express specific unconscious needs through phobias. These needs that were suppressed deep within themselves created anxiety and tension. The stress, fear, and anxiety that characterize a phobic disorder were the discharge.

Reaction formation: Cognizant practices are embraced to overcompensate for the nervousness an individual feels in regards to their socially inadmissible oblivious considerations or feelings. Typically, a response arrangement is set apart by misrepresented conduct, like garishness and urgency. An illustration of reaction formation incorporates the loyal little girl who adores her mom is responding to her Oedipus scorn of her mom.

== The psychoanalytic mainstream ==
Among Freud's mainstream followers, Otto Fenichel highlighted the displacement of affect, either through postponement or by redirection, or both. More broadly, he considered that "in part the paths of displacement depend on the nature of the drives that are warded off".

Freud's daughter, Anna Freud, also played an important role in the upbringing of these defense mechanisms by the twentieth century. She introduced and analyzed ten of her own defense mechanisms and her work has been used and increased through the years by newer psychoanalysts.

Eric Berne in his first, psychoanalytic work, maintained that "some of the most interesting and socially useful displacements of libido occur when both the aim and the object are partial substitutions for the biological aim and object...sublimation".

== Lacan ==
In 1957, psychoanalyst Jacques Lacan, inspired by an article by linguist Roman Jakobson on metaphor and metonymy, argued that the unconscious has the structure of a language, linking displacement to the poetic function of metonymy, and condensation to that of metaphor.

As Lacan put it, "in the case of Verschiebung, 'displacement', the German term is closer to the idea of that veering off of signification that we see in metonymy, and which from its first appearance in Freud is represented as the most appropriate means used by the unconscious to foil censorship".

== Aggression ==
Within the Freudian psychoanalytic framework, the aggressive drives may be displaced in a similar manner to the libidinal drives. Business or athletic competition, or hunting, for instance, may offer opportunities for the expression of displaced aggression. In such scapegoating behavior, aggression may be displaced onto items or people with little to no connection to the cause of the aggressors' frustration.

Freud proposed that homosexuality could sometimes originate when hostile rivalry toward another person, having no realistic prospect of satisfaction, is replaced by an affectionate attachment. Because the hostile impulse has no realistic outlet for satisfaction, the pleasure principle favors an alternative path that does offer discharge – so the hostility is displaced into a loving attachment instead.

Displacement can also act in what looks like a 'chain reaction,' with people unwittingly becoming both victims and perpetrators of displacement. For example, a man is angry with his boss, but he cannot express this properly, so he hits his wife. The wife, in turn, hits one of the children, possibly disguising this as a "punishment." (rationalization)

Ego psychology sought to use displacement in child rearing, a dummy being used as a displaced target for toddler sibling rivalry. With a purpose to apprehend how the ego uses defense mechanisms, it is important to apprehend the defense mechanisms themselves and the way they function. A few defense mechanisms are visible as protecting us from the internal impulses (e.g., repression); other defense mechanisms guard us from external threats (e.g., denial).

== Transferential displacement ==
The displacement of feelings and attitudes from past significant others onto the present-day ones constitutes a central aspect of the transference, particularly in the case of the neurotic.

A subsidiary form of displacement within the transference occurs when the patient disguises transference references by applying them to an apparent third party or to themself.

== Criticism ==
Later writers have objected that whereas Freud only described the displacement of sex into culture, for example, the converse – social conflict being displaced into sexuality – is also true.

Freud's hypothesis is acceptable at clarifying however not at anticipating conduct. Therefore, Freud's hypothesis is unfalsifiable - it cannot be demonstrated valid or invalidated. Freud may likewise have shown research predisposition in his understandings - he may just focused on data which upheld his hypotheses, and overlooked data and different clarifications that didn't fit them.

== See also ==
- Cathexis
- Displacement activity
- Dream interpretation
- Identified patient
- Ignacio Matte Blanco
- Kick the cat
- Displaced aggression
