= Condensation (psychology) =

Concept in Freudian psychology

In Freudian psychoanalysis, a condensation (German: Verdichtung) is when a single idea (an image, memory, or thought) or dream object stands for several associations and ideas. This is an energetic reshuffling in which mental energy flows freely from one idea etc. to another. This free change of psychic energy is characteristic of so-called primary processes, which do not function with the aim of mental identity, but rather aim to fulfill pleasure, even self-deception to a certain extent, in order to make life easier, i.e. to avoid unpleasant and harmful things: a camouflage, reinterpretation, reconnection of disliked perceptions or memories. However, condensations can also be the determining factor for misperceptions, the psychoenergetic dynamics of which are not free-flowing, as certain external and internal motives are also involved. This can trigger avoidance behavior in the affected person.

== In dreams, symptoms, and jokes ==
Freud considered that "dreams are brief, meagre and laconic in comparison with the range and wealth of the dream-thoughts." Images and chains of association have their emotional charges displaced from the originating ideas to the receiving one, where they merge and "condense" together. Thus for example a dream figure may resemble A, wear B's clothes and act like C, but nevertheless we know somehow that they are 'really' D - rather as with the composite photographs of Francis Galton. While condensation could serve the purposes of the dream censorship by disguising thoughts, Freud considered condensation as primarily the preferred mode of functioning of the unconscious Id.

Freud saw the same mechanism of condensation at work in phantasies and neurotic symptoms, as well as in parapraxis and jokes: he often cited as an instance Heine's quip about the rich man treating him 'famillionairily'.

== In metaphor and metonymy ==
In the 1950s the concept was used by linguist Roman Jakobson in his influential article on metaphor and metonymy. Comparing the linguistic evidence to Freud's account of the dream-work, Jakobson saw symbolism as relating to metaphor, condensation, and displacement to metonymy. Jakobson's work encouraged Jacques Lacan to say that the unconscious is structured like a language.

== See also ==
- Cathexis
- Complex (psychology)
- Dream interpretation
- Mental representation
- Portmanteau
- Priming (psychology)

== Sources ==
- Alain de Mijolla (ed.). International Dictionary of Psychoanalysis, 1st vol.: "Condensation", Macmillan Reference Books, ISBN 0-02-865924-4
