= Dream interpretation =

Assigning of meaning to dreams

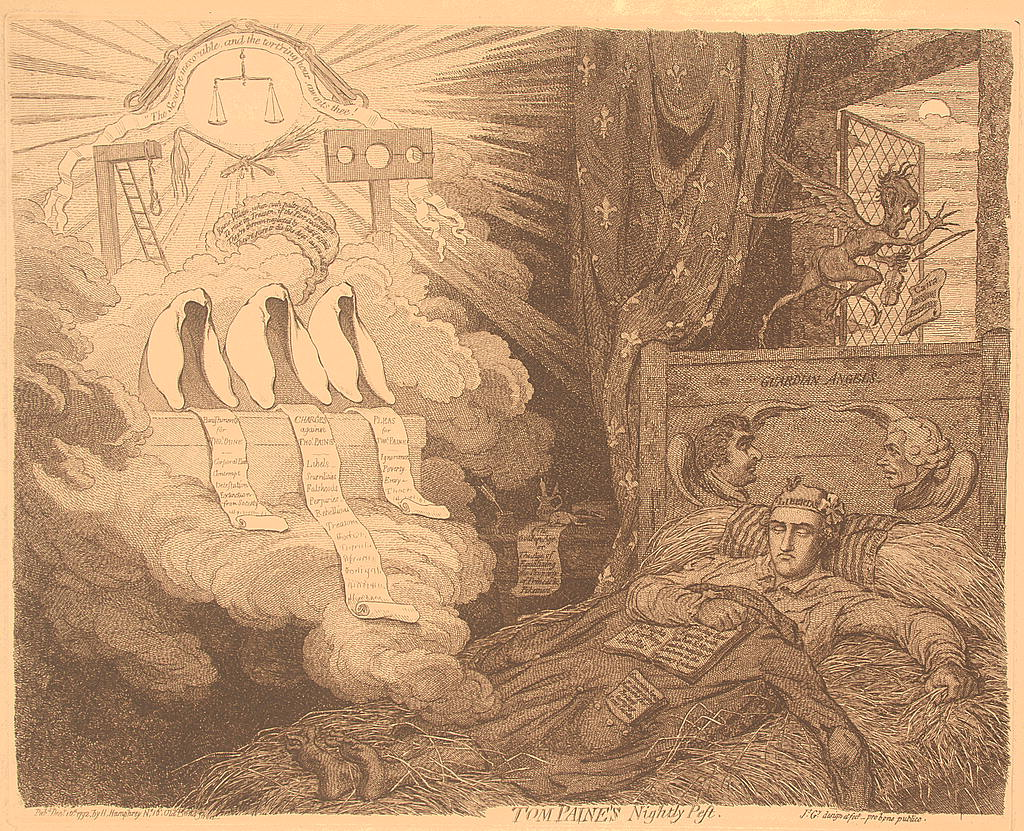
Tom Paine's Nightly Pest, a James Gillray cartoon of political activist Thomas Paine dreaming of faceless judges unfurling scrolls listing charges and punishments

Dream interpretation is the process of assigning meaning to dreams. In many ancient societies, such as those of Egypt and Greece, dreaming was considered a supernatural communication or a means of divine intervention, whose message could be interpreted by people with these associated spiritual powers. In the modern era, various schools of psychology and neurobiology have offered theories about the meaning and purpose of dreams.

== History ==
=== Early civilizations ===
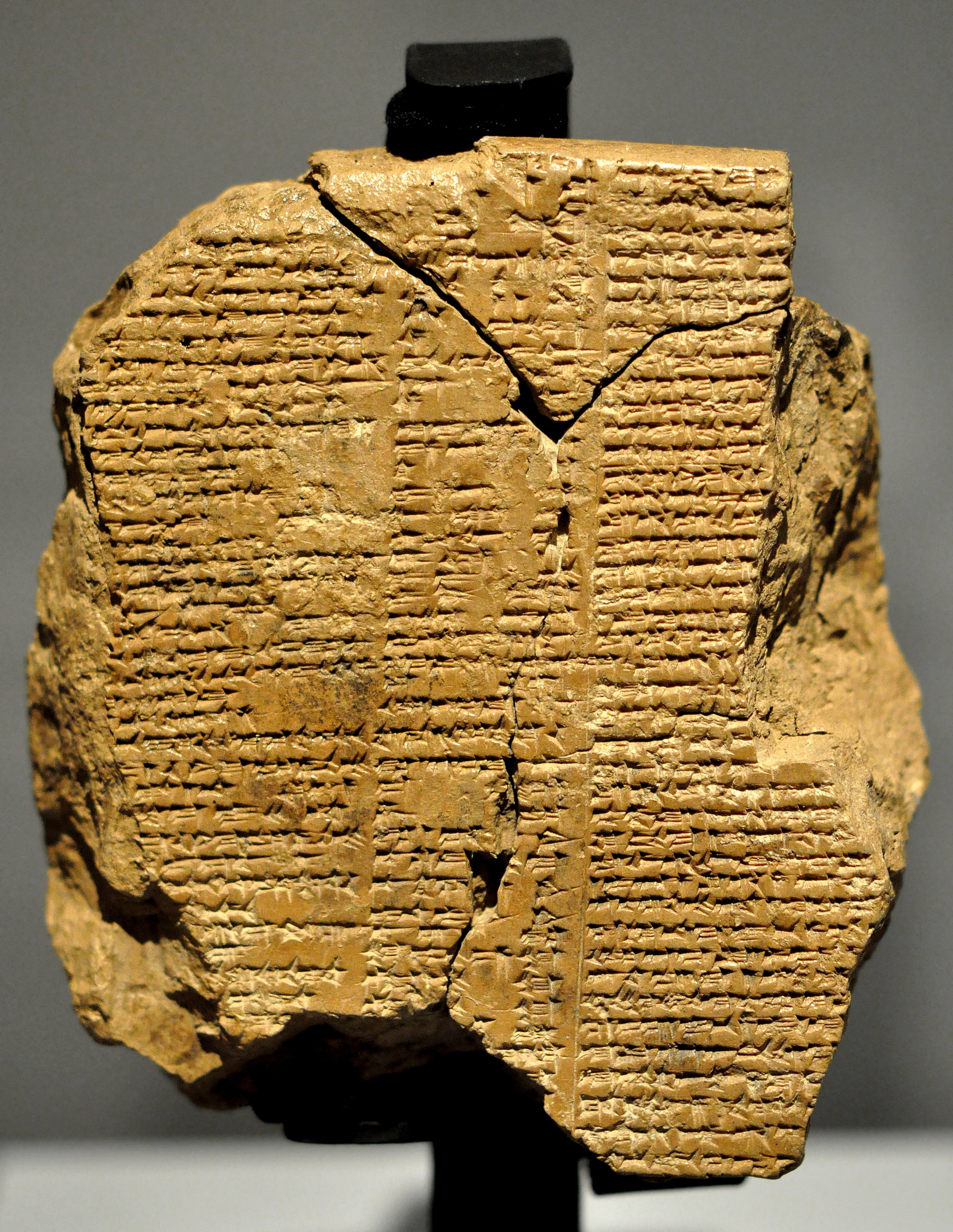
The ancient Akkadian Epic of Gilgamesh (Tablet V pictured) contains numerous examples of dream interpretation.

The ancient Sumerians in Mesopotamia have left evidence of dream interpretation dating back to at least 3100 BC. Throughout Mesopotamian history, dreams were always held to be extremely important for divination and Mesopotamian kings paid close attention to them. Gudea, the king of the Sumerian city-state of Lagash (reigned c. 2144–2124 BC), rebuilt the temple of Ningirsu as a result of a dream in which he was told to do so. Gudea dreamed of a huge and powerful figure who looked part god, part bird, and part storm, with lions beside him to show his strength. This figure told Gudea to build a temple, but Gudea did not fully understand the message. Ningirsu also promised to send gentle rain and good weather so the building would be successful, which shows that people at the time believed dreams were important messages that came during sleep when the mind was quiet and open.

The standard Akkadian Epic of Gilgamesh contains numerous accounts of the prophetic power of dreams. First, Gilgamesh himself has two dreams foretelling the arrival of Enkidu. In one of these dreams, Gilgamesh sees an axe fall from the sky. The people gather around it in admiration and worship. Gilgamesh throws the axe in front of his mother Ninsun and then embraces it like a wife. Ninsun interprets the dream to mean that someone powerful will soon appear. Gilgamesh will struggle with him and try to overpower him, but he will not succeed. Eventually, they will become close friends and accomplish great things. She concludes, "That you embraced him like a wife means he will never forsake you. Thus your dream is solved." Later in the epic, Enkidu dreams about the heroes' encounter with the giant Humbaba. Dreams were also sometimes seen as a means of seeing into other worlds and it was thought that the soul, or some part of it, moved out of the body of the sleeping person and actually visited the places and persons the dreamer saw in his or her sleep. In Tablet VII of the epic, Enkidu recounts to Gilgamesh a dream in which he saw the gods Anu, Enlil, and Shamash condemn him to death. He also has a dream in which he visits the Underworld.

The Assyrian king Ashurnasirpal II (reigned 883–859 BC) built a temple to Mamu, possibly the god of dreams, at Imgur-Enlil, near Kalhu. The later Assyrian king Ashurbanipal (reigned 668–c. 627 BC) had a dream during a desperate military situation in which his divine patron, the goddess Ishtar, appeared to him and promised that she would lead him to victory. The Babylonians and Assyrians divided dreams into "good", which were sent by the gods, and "bad", sent by demons. A surviving collection of dream omens entitled Iškar Zaqīqu records various dream scenarios as well as prognostications of what will happen to the person who experiences each dream, apparently based on previous cases. Some list different possible outcomes, based on occasions in which people experienced similar dreams with different results. Dream scenarios mentioned include a variety of daily work events, journeys to different locations, family matters, sex acts, and encounters with human individuals, animals, and deities.

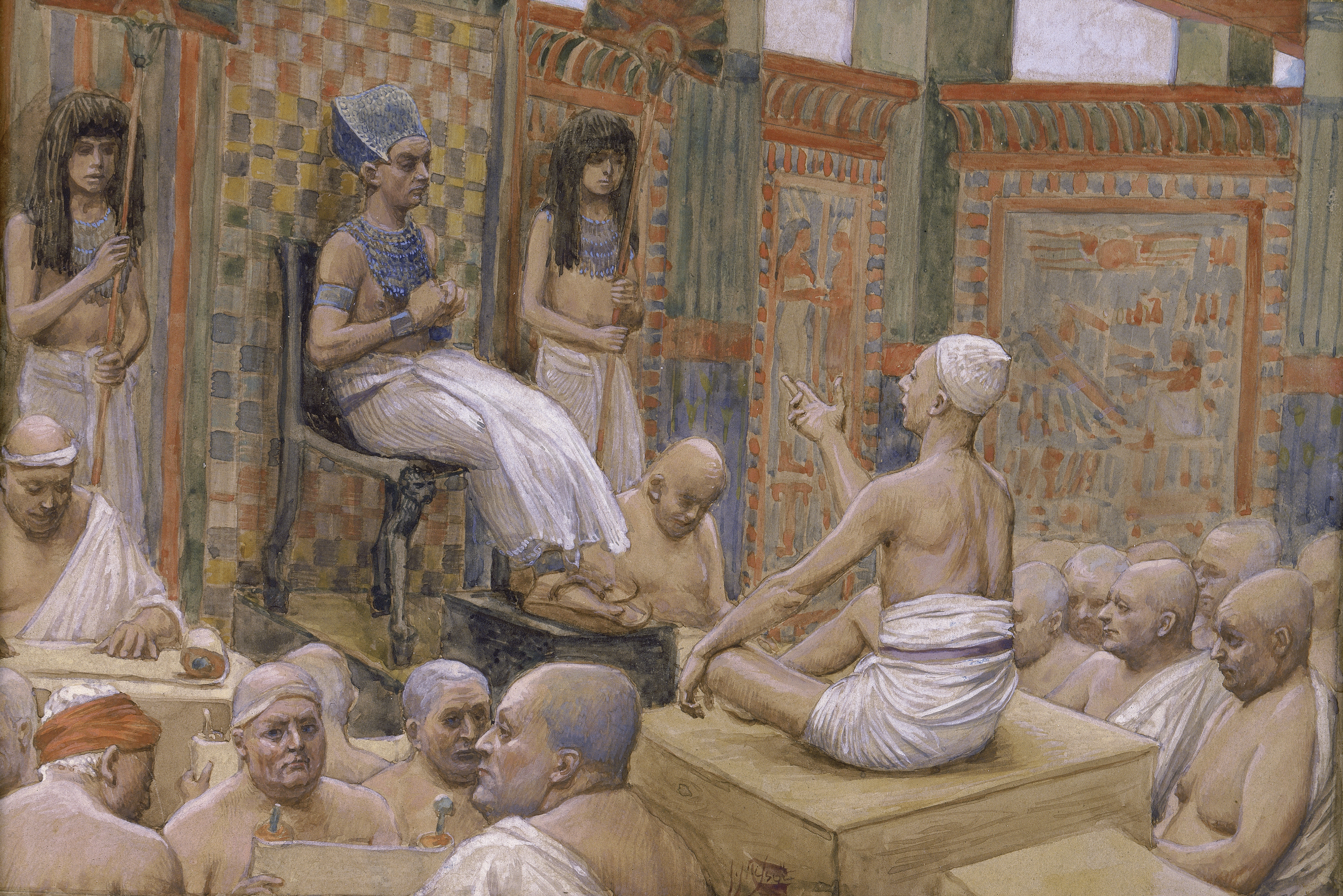
Joseph Interprets Pharaoh's Dream (watercolor circa 1896–1902 by James Tissot)

In ancient Egypt, priests acted as dream interpreters. Hieroglyphics depicting dreams and their interpretations are evident. Dreams have been held in considerable importance throughout history by most cultures. In the biblical account of Joseph's interpretation of his fellow prisoners in an Egyptian prison, two officials are portrayed as downcast because no-one can interpret their dreams. Joseph, who goes on in the narrative to provide interpretations, initially states "Do not interpretations belong to God?"

=== Classical Antiquity ===
The ancient Greeks constructed temples they called Asclepieions, where sick people were sent to be cured. It was believed that cures would be effected through divine grace by incubating dreams within the confines of the temple. Dreams were also considered prophetic or omens of particular significance. Artemidorus of Daldis, who lived in the 2nd century AD, wrote a comprehensive text Oneirocritica (The Interpretation of Dreams). Although Artemidorus believed that dreams can predict the future, he presaged many contemporary approaches to dreams. He thought that the meaning of a dream image could involve puns and could be understood by decoding the image into its component words. For example, Alexander, while waging war against the Tyrians, dreamt that a satyr was dancing on his shield. Artemidorus reports that this dream was interpreted as follows: satyr = sa tyros ("Tyre will be thine"), predicting that Alexander would be triumphant. Freud acknowledged this example of Artemidorus when he proposed that dreams be interpreted like a rebus.

=== Middle Ages ===
In medieval Islamic psychology, certain hadiths indicate that dreams consist of three parts, and early Muslim scholars recognized three kinds of dreams: false, pathogenic, and true. Ibn Sirin (654–728) was renowned for his Ta'bir al-Ru'ya and Muntakhab al-Kalam fi Tabir al-Ahlam, a book on dreams. The work is divided into 25 sections on dream interpretation, from the etiquette of interpreting dreams to the interpretation of reciting certain Surahs of the Qur'an in one's dream. He writes that it is important for a layperson to seek assistance from an alim (Muslim scholar) who could guide in the interpretation of dreams with a proper understanding of the cultural context and other such causes and interpretations. Al-Kindi (Alkindus) (801–873) also wrote a treatise on dream interpretation: On Sleep and Dreams. In consciousness studies, Al-Farabi (872–951) wrote the On the Cause of Dreams, which appeared as chapter 24 of his Book of Opinions of the people of the Ideal City. It was a treatise on dreams, in which he was the first to distinguish between dream interpretation and the nature and causes of dreams. In The Canon of Medicine, Avicenna extended the theory of temperaments to encompass "emotional aspects, mental capacity, moral attitudes, self-awareness, movements and dreams." Ibn Khaldun's Muqaddimah (1377) states that "confused dreams" are "pictures of the imagination that are stored inside by perception and to which the ability to think is applied, after (man) has retired from sense perception."

Ibn Shaheen states: "Interpretations change their foundations according to the different conditions of the seer (of the vision), so seeing handcuffs during sleep is disliked but if a righteous person sees them it can mean stopping the hands from evil". Ibn Sirin said about a man who saw himself giving a sermon from the mimbar: "He will achieve authority and if he is not from the people who have any kind of authority it means that he will be crucified".

=== China ===
A standard traditional Chinese book on dream-interpretation is the Lofty Principles of Dream Interpretation (夢占逸旨) compiled in the 16th century by Chen Shiyuan (particularly the "Inner Chapters" of that opus). Chinese thinkers also raised profound ideas about dream interpretation, such as the question of how we know we are dreaming and how we know we are awake. It is written in the Chuang-tzu: "Once Chuang Chou dreamed that he was a butterfly. He fluttered about happily, quite pleased with the state that he was in, and knew nothing about Chuang Chou. Presently he awoke and found that he was very much Chuang Chou again. Now, did Chou dream that he was a butterfly or was the butterfly now dreaming that he was Chou?"

=== Modern Europe ===
In the 17th century, the English physician and writer Sir Thomas Browne wrote a short tract upon the interpretation of dreams. Dream interpretation became an important part of psychoanalysis at the end of the 19th century with Sigmund Freud's seminal work The Interpretation of Dreams (Die Traumdeutung; literally "dream-interpretation").

== Psychology ==
=== Freud ===
In The Interpretation of Dreams, Sigmund Freud argued that all dream content is disguised wish-fulfillment (later in Beyond the Pleasure Principle, Freud would discuss dreams which do not appear to be wish-fulfillment). According to Freud, the instigation of a dream is often to be found in the events of the day preceding the dream, which he called the "day residue." In very young children, this can be easily seen, as they dream quite straightforwardly of the fulfillment of wishes that were aroused in them the previous day (the "dream day"). Sigmund Freud believed that dreams are a way for repressed wishes in the unconscious mind to be expressed. He explained that the manifest content of a dream is what we remember, while the latent content is the hidden meaning behind it. Freud also described a process called dream-work, which uses methods like condensation, displacement, and symbolization to hide unacceptable desires while still allowing them to appear in dreams.

In adults the situation is more complicated since, in Freud's analysis, the dreams of adults have been subjected to distortion, with the dream's so-called "manifest content" being a heavily disguised derivative of the "latent dream-thoughts" present in the unconscious. The dream's real significance is thus concealed: dreamers are no more capable of recognizing the actual meaning of their dreams than hysterics are able to understand the connection and significance of their neurotic symptoms.

In Freud's original formulation, the latent dream-thought was described as having been subject to an intra-psychic force referred to as "the censor"; in the terminology of his later years, however, discussion was in terms of the super-ego and the work of the ego's defence mechanisms. In waking life, he asserted, these "resistances" prevented the repressed wishes of the unconscious from entering consciousness, and though these wishes were to some extent able to emerge due to the lowered vigilance of the sleep state, the resistances were still strong enough to force them to take on a disguised or distorted form. Freud's view was that dreams are compromises which ensure that sleep is not interrupted: as "a disguised fulfilment of repressed wishes," they succeed in representing wishes as fulfilled which might otherwise disturb and waken the sleeper.

One of Freud's early dream analyses is "Irma's injection", a dream he himself had. In the dream a former patient of his, Irma, complains of pains and Freud's colleague gives her an unsterile injection. Freud provides pages of associations to the elements in his dream, using it to demonstrate his technique of decoding the latent dream thoughts from the manifest content of the dream.

Freud suggests that the true meaning of a dream must be "weeded out" from the dream as recalled:

You entirely disregard the apparent connections between the elements in the manifest dream and collect the ideas that occur to you in connection with each separate element of the dream by free association according to the psychoanalytic rule of procedure. From this material you arrive at the latent dream-thoughts, just as you arrived at the patient's hidden complexes from his associations to his symptoms and memories... The true meaning of the dream, which has now replaced the manifest content, is always clearly intelligible. [Freud, Five Lectures on Psycho-Analysis (1909); Lecture Three]

Freud listed the distorting operations that he claimed were applied to repressed wishes in forming the dream as recollected: it is because of these distortions (the so-called "dream-work") that the manifest content of the dream differs so greatly from the latent dream thought reached through analysis—and it is by reversing these distortions that the latent content is approached.

The operations included:

- Condensation – one dream object stands for several associations and ideas; thus "dreams are brief, meagre and laconic in comparison with the range and wealth of the dream-thoughts."
- Displacement – a dream object's emotional significance is separated from its real object or content and attached to an entirely different one that does not raise the censor's suspicions.
- Visualization – a thought is translated to visual images.
- Symbolism – a symbol replaces an action, person, or idea.

To these might be added "secondary elaboration"—the outcome of the dreamer's natural tendency to make some sort of "sense" or "story" out of the various elements of the manifest content as recollected. Freud stressed that it was not merely futile but actually misleading to attempt to explain one part of the manifest content with reference to another part, as if the manifest dream somehow constituted some unified or coherent conception.

Freud considered that the experience of anxiety dreams and nightmares was the result of failures in the dream-work: rather than contradicting the "wish-fulfillment" theory, such phenomena demonstrated how the ego reacted to the awareness of repressed wishes that were too powerful and insufficiently disguised. Traumatic dreams (where the dream merely repeats the traumatic experience) were eventually admitted as exceptions to the theory.

Freud famously described psychoanalytic dream-interpretation as "the royal road to a knowledge of the unconscious activities of the mind". However, he expressed regret and dissatisfaction at the way his ideas on the subject were misrepresented or simply not understood:

The assertion that all dreams require a sexual interpretation, against which critics rage so incessantly, occurs nowhere in my Interpretation of Dreams ... and is in obvious contradiction to other views expressed in it.

=== Jung ===
Although not dismissing Freud's model of dream interpretation wholesale, Carl Jung believed Freud's notion of dreams as representations of unfulfilled wishes to be limited. Jung argued that Freud's procedure of collecting associations to a dream would bring insights into the dreamer's mental complex—a person's associations to anything will reveal the mental complexes, as Jung had shown experimentally—but not necessarily closer to the meaning of the dream. Jung was convinced that the scope of dream interpretation was larger, reflecting the richness and complexity of the entire unconscious, both personal and collective. Jung believed the psyche to be a self-regulating organism in which conscious attitudes were likely to be compensated for unconsciously (within the dream) by their opposites. And so the role of dreams is to lead a person to wholeness through what Jung calls "a dialogue between ego and the self". The self aspires to tell the ego what it does not know, but it should. This dialogue involves fresh memories, existing obstacles, and future solutions.

Jung proposed two basic approaches to analyzing dream material: the objective and the subjective. In the objective approach, every person in the dream refers to the person they are: mother is mother, girlfriend is girlfriend, etc. In the subjective approach, every person in the dream represents an aspect of the dreamer. Jung argued that the subjective approach is much more difficult for the dreamer to accept, but that in most good dream-work, the dreamer will come to recognize that the dream characters can represent an unacknowledged aspect of the dreamer. Thus, if the dreamer is being chased by a crazed killer, the dreamer may come eventually to recognize his own homicidal impulses. Gestalt therapists extended the subjective approach, claiming that even the inanimate objects in a dream can represent aspects of the dreamer.

Jung believed that archetypes such as the animus, the anima, the shadow, and others manifested themselves in dreams, as dream symbols or figures. Such figures could take the form of an old man, a young maiden, or a giant spider as the case may be. Each represents an unconscious attitude that is largely hidden to the conscious mind. Although an integral part of the dreamer's psyche, these manifestations were largely autonomous and were perceived by the dreamer to be external personages. Acquaintance with the archetypes as manifested by these symbols serve to increase one's awareness of unconscious attitudes, integrating seemingly disparate parts of the psyche and contributing to the process of holistic self-understanding he considered paramount.

Jung believed that material repressed by the conscious mind, postulated by Freud to comprise the unconscious, was similar to his own concept of the shadow, which in itself is only a small part of the unconscious.

Jung cautioned against blindly ascribing meaning to dream symbols without a clear understanding of the client's personal situation. He described two approaches to dream symbols: the causal approach and the final approach. In the causal approach, the symbol is reduced to certain fundamental tendencies. Thus, a sword may symbolize a penis, as may a snake. In the final approach, the dream interpreter asks, "Why this symbol and not another?" Thus, a sword representing a penis is hard, sharp, inanimate, and destructive. A snake representing a penis is alive, dangerous, perhaps poisonous, and slimy. The final approach will tell additional things about the dreamer's attitudes.

Technically, Jung recommended stripping the dream of its details and presenting the gist of the dream to the dreamer. This was an adaptation of a procedure described by Wilhelm Stekel, who recommended thinking of the dream as a newspaper article and writing a headline for it. Harry Stack Sullivan also described a similar process of "dream distillation."

Although Jung acknowledged the universality of archetypal symbols, he contrasted this with the concept of a sign—images having a one-to-one connotation with their meaning. His approach was to recognize the dynamism and fluidity that existed between symbols and their ascribed meaning. Symbols must be explored for their personal significance to the patient, instead of having the dream conform to some predetermined idea. This prevents dream analysis from devolving into a theoretical and dogmatic exercise that is far removed from the patient's own psychological state. In the service of this idea, he stressed the importance of "sticking to the image"—exploring in depth a client's association with a particular image. This may be contrasted with Freud's free associating which he believed was a deviation from the salience of the image. He describes for example the image "deal table." One would expect the dreamer to have some associations with this image, and the professed lack of any perceived significance or familiarity whatsoever should make one suspicious. Jung would ask a patient to imagine the image as vividly as possible and to explain it to him as if he had no idea as to what a "deal table" was. Jung stressed the importance of context in dream analysis.

Jung stressed that the dream was not merely a devious puzzle invented by the unconscious to be deciphered, so that the true causal factors behind it may be elicited. Dreams were not to serve as lie detectors, with which to reveal the insincerity behind conscious thought processes. Dreams, like the unconscious, had their own language. As representations of the unconscious, dream images have their own primacy and mechanics.

Jung believed that dreams may contain ineluctable truths, philosophical pronouncements, illusions, wild fantasies, memories, plans, irrational experiences, and even telepathic visions. Just as the psyche has a diurnal side which we experience as conscious life, it has an unconscious nocturnal side which we apprehend as dreamlike fantasy. Jung would argue that just as we do not doubt the importance of our conscious experience, then we ought not to second guess the value of our unconscious lives.

=== Hall ===
In 1953, Calvin S. Hall developed a theory of dreams in which dreaming is considered to be a cognitive process. Hall argued that a dream was simply a thought or sequence of thoughts that occurred during sleep, and that dream images are visual representations of personal conceptions. For example, if one dreams of being attacked by friends, this may be a manifestation of fear of friendship; a more complicated example, which requires a cultural metaphor, is that a cat within a dream symbolizes a need to use one's intuition. For English speakers, it may suggest that the dreamer must recognize that there is "more than one way to skin a cat," or in other words, more than one way to do something. He was also critical of Sigmund Freud's psychoanalytic theory of dream interpretation, particularly Freud's notion that the dream of being attacked represented a fear of castration. Hall argued that this dream did not necessarily stem from castration anxiety, but rather represented the dreamer's perception of themselves as weak, passive, and helpless in the face of danger. In support of his argument, Hall pointed out that women have this dream more frequently than men, yet women do not typically experience castration anxiety. Additionally, he noted that there were no significant differences in the form or content of the dream of being attacked between men and women, suggesting that the dream likely has the same meaning for both genders. Hall's work in dream research also provided evidence to support one of Sigmund Freud's theories, the Oedipus Complex. Hall studied the dreams of males and females ages two through twenty-six. He found that young boys frequently dreamed of aggression towards their fathers and older male siblings, while girls dreamed of hostility towards their mothers and older female siblings. These dreams often involved themes of conflict and competition for the affection of the opposite-sex parent, providing empirical support for Freud's theory of the Oedipus Complex.

=== Faraday, Clift, et al. ===
In the 1970s, Ann Faraday and others helped bring dream interpretation into the mainstream by publishing books on do-it-yourself dream interpretation and forming groups to share and analyze dreams. Faraday focused on the application of dreams to situations occurring in one's life. For instance, some dreams are warnings of something about to happen—e.g. a dream of failing an examination, if one is a student, may be a literal warning of unpreparedness. Outside of such context, it could relate to failing some other kind of test. Or it could even have a "punny" nature, e.g. that one has failed to examine some aspect of his life adequately.

Faraday noted that "one finding has emerged pretty firmly from modern research, namely that the majority of dreams seem in some way to reflect things that have preoccupied our minds during the previous day or two."

In the 1980s and 1990s, Wallace Clift and Jean Dalby Clift further explored the relationship between images produced in dreams and the dreamer's waking life. Their books identified patterns in dreaming, and ways of analyzing dreams to explore life changes, with particular emphasis on moving toward healing and wholeness.

=== Neurobiological theory ===
Allan Hobson and colleagues developed what they called the activation-synthesis hypothesis which proposes that dreams are simply the side effects of the neural activity in the brain that produces beta brain waves during REM sleep that are associated with wakefulness. According to this hypothesis, neurons fire periodically during sleep in the lower brain levels and thus send random signals to the cortex. The cortex then synthesizes a dream in reaction to these signals in order to try to make sense of why the brain is sending them. Although the hypothesis downplays the role that emotional factors play in determining dreams, it does not state that dreams are meaningless.

== Present-day popular attitudes ==
Most people currently appear to interpret dream content according to Freudian psychoanalysis in the United States, India, and South Korea, according to one study conducted in those countries. People appear to believe dreams are particularly meaningful: they assign more meaning to dreams than to similar waking thoughts. For example, people report they would be more likely to cancel a trip they had planned that involved a plane flight if they dreamt of their plane crashing the night before than if the Department of Homeland Security issued a federal warning. However, people do not attribute equal importance to all dreams. People appear to use motivated reasoning when interpreting their dreams. They are more likely to view dreams confirming their waking beliefs and desires to be more meaningful than dreams that contradict their waking beliefs and desires.

A paper in 2009 by Carey Morewedge and Michael Norton in the Journal of Personality and Social Psychology found that most people believe that "their dreams reveal meaningful hidden truths." In one study they found that 74% of Indians, 65% of South Koreans and 56% of Americans believed their dream content provided them with meaningful insight into their unconscious beliefs and desires. This Freudian view of dreaming was endorsed significantly more than theories of dreaming that attribute dream content to memory consolidation, problem solving, or random brain activity. This belief appears to lead people to attribute more importance to dream content than to similar thought content that occurs while they are awake. People were more likely to view a positive dream about a friend to be meaningful than a positive dream about someone they disliked, for example, and were more likely to view a negative dream about a person they disliked as meaningful than a negative dream about a person they liked.

== See also ==
- Dream dictionary
- Dream journal
- Dream sharing
- Dreams in analytical psychology
- Lucid dreaming
- Oneiromancy
- Oneironautics
- Personality test
- Psychoanalytic dream interpretation
- Recurring dream
