= Dream sharing =

Discussion of dreams with others

Dream sharing is the process of documenting or discussing both night and daydreams with others. Dreams are novel but realistic simulations of waking social life. One of the primary purposes of sharing dreams is entertainment.

Dream sharing is a strategy that tests and strengthens the bond between people. A dream can be described as a calculated social interaction and a way to bring individuals closer together. Individuals choose to share dreams with those that they know well or want to know well.

Dreams are a common denominator amongst humans of all nations and cultures. Increasing the rate of discussion regarding dreams leads to more understanding about the personality of someone otherwise difficult to connect with due to language or cultural barriers.

== Demographics ==
Currently, dream sharing is more prevalent in certain demographics. Women are found to share and discuss dreams and nightmares more frequently than men. During this discovery, dream and nightmare recall were controlled to be proportional frequencies across the two sexes, signifying that the differences in dream sharing were not due to biological dream factors such as memory, but from the stigma around men sharing personal thoughts with each other. Men remain independent and reject the need for social support. Often these traits are developed from male social stigma. Personality traits such as openness and extraversion were also positively correlated with dream-sharing frequency.

== Relationships ==
When couples talk about their dreams with each other, it seems to be linked to feeling closer in their relationship. In other words, the more they share their dreams, the stronger their sense of intimacy. This suggests that open communication about dreams may contribute to a deeper connection between romantic partners. Engaging in conversations about dreams enhances the levels of empathy the listener feels toward the dreamer and also fosters a deeper connection by investigating the intricate landscapes of the subconscious mind. As individuals share their dreams, a unique window into their thoughts, emotions, and aspirations opens up, creating a rich tapestry of understanding. This exchange of dreams can cultivate empathy by providing insight into the dreamer's inner world, fostering a more profound appreciation for their experiences and perspectives.

== Stress relief ==
Dream sharing is also associated with stress relief. The relationship between dreams and stress relief is complex and can vary from person to person. A few ways in which dreaming and sharing dreams might contribute to stress relief are emotional processing, catharsis, symbolic exploration, social connection, and mindfulness and relaxation.

== History ==
The sharing of dreams dates back at least as far as 4000-3000 BC in permanent form on clay tablets. In ancient Egypt, dreams were among the items recorded in the form of hieroglyphics. In ancient Egyptian culture dream sharing had a religious context as priests doubled as dream interpreters.

Those whose dreams were especially vivid or significant were thought to be blessed and were given special status in these ancient societies. Likewise, people who were able to interpret dreams were thought to receive these gifts directly from the gods, and they enjoyed a special status in society as well.

The respect for dreams changed radically early in the 19th century, and dreams in that era were often dismissed as reactions to anxiety, outside noises or even bad food and indigestion. During this period of time, dreams were thought to have no meaning at all, and interest in dream interpretation all but evaporated. This all changed, however, with the arrival of Sigmund Freud later in the 19th century. Freud stunned the world of psychiatry by stressing the importance of dreams, and he revived the once dead art of dream interpretation.

== Freud's interpretation ==
Freud represented the view that in order to understand one's unconscious, dreams are to be dissected and discussed.

== See also ==
- Dream diary
- Dream interpretation
