= Psychological typologies =

Classification used by psychologists to describe the distinctions between people

Psychological typologies are classifications used by psychologists to describe the distinctions between people. The problem of finding the essential basis for the classification of psychological types—that is, the basis of determining a broader spectrum of derivative characteristics—is crucial in differential psychology.

== Historical background ==
=== Logic of development of classification hypotheses in psychology ===
The history of human studies from a system-classification perspective reveals a struggle between two opposing methodological approaches, each with distinct goals:

1) to "catch" the central organizing link, some kind of motor of all design, and to distribute people by the qualitative specificity of these central links;

"The typological approach consists in the global perception of the person with the following reduction of variety of individual forms to a small number of the groups uniting around the representative type" (Meily, 1960).

2) to decompose the psyche to its components in order to understand the work of its parts and to create a classification based on the differences in the structure and quality of the parts.

"It is necessary to reduce all the personality character traits to the elementary mental elements and to the elementary forms of the basic psychological laws, revealing the nature of the discovered ties" (Polan, 1894).

At present there are several thousand various psychological classifications that point to these or other distinctions between people, or mental characteristics, as such.

The classifications may vary in their foundational scales of generalization and degrees of internal consistency.

=== Classification of people and psychological characteristics ===
The logic of psychological classifications development demanded a parallel existence of two scientific approaches: one of which was named "psychology of types", and the other—"psychology of traits". In the course of time, both approaches shifted towards each other: the psychology of types—in attempts to understand the structure of psychological traits of every type, trait psychology—in attempts to achieve a higher system of generalizations.

"As soon as the fact that the observable traits do not correspond to separate essential psychic characteristics and rather are only aspects of the personality and behavior, received general recognition immediately appeared as the necessity to reveal the fundamental factors behind the traits. Haimans and Virsma as well as other scientists after them tried to solve the problem. However all these researches had a fragmentary character, their results have been caused by preliminary hypotheses, and the choice of traits as a rule was determined by the personal view of the researcher" R.Maily

An example of trait psychology development (stages):

1. Singling out the types of love as psychology of traits. In the Antique time, the typology of the kinds of love was very popular. These kinds of love comprised:
- Eros – a passionate physical and emotional love based on aesthetic enjoyment; stereotype of romantic love
- Ludus – a love that is played as a game or sport; conquest
- Storge – an affectionate love that slowly develops from friendship, based on similarity (kindred to Philia)
- Pragma – love that is driven by the head, not the heart; undemonstrative
- Mania – highly volatile love; obsession; fueled by low self-esteem
- Agape – selfless altruistic love; spiritual; motherly love

Every person, as a rule, possesses all the possible types of love, but in different proportion. Which can be expressed by the profile characteristic with ups and downs.

The types of people with similar profile characteristics combined into classification of higher level.

Examples of type-psychology development (stages):

1. Singling out groups of people that have obvious dominance of conscious cognitive operations— "Rationals" or unconscious operations —"Irrationals".
2. The specific cognitive abilities connected with rationality and irrationality.
3. A network for the profile characteristic is worked out which is typical for rationals and irrationals.

In the course of the development of psychology as a science and a practice, the understanding has developed that the individual is a "microcosm", which has all traits, properties, and characteristics, but they are distributed according to certain systemic laws, which have yet to be discovered.

=== Psychological type scales ===
==== Cosmologies ====
Systems of views about the material and mental world is based on principles of harmony, common universal laws of the nature and mind, and those with the greatest scale and orderliness. Everything, including the principle of psychological classification, has mathematical accuracy and clearness. The typology has the subordinated role, it reflects the natural belonging to cosmic laws.

Example: Psycosmology

==== Formal typology ====
Classifications that included stable types singled out on the basis of some psychological or anatomo-physiological traits refer to formal typologies. The formal typology may have quote varies scale. Often these are typologies are based on the behavior of particulars in a certain activity.

Example: Herman Witkin in 1954 singled out types of people as field-dependent and field-independent. The field dependent do not see a simple figure in a complex geometrical background. The field independent can single out the figure from a complex geometrical background.

==== Dynamic typology ====
The dynamic typologies are connected with change and transformations of people, and with going through stages in their development (biological, psychological, social).

Example: From the psychoanalytical point of view, the child in her development undergoes a number of psychosexual stages which creates a particular make up of the soul and mind, of a psychological type.

The developing person is viewed as an auto-erotic creature that receives sensual pleasure from stimulation of erogenous zones of the body by the parents or other people during the process of rearing. Freud believed that for every such stage there is a particular erogenous zone.

The person goes through certain studies in the development of self-consciousness in the search of Self. Carl Jung considered the Self to be a central archetype, the one of order and wholeness of personality. Jung called ability of humans to self-cognition and self-development as individuation confluence of her/his conscious and unconscious. The first stage of the individuation is the acquisition of the element in the structure of the personality psyche called the person or mask, which hides the real self and the unconscious (also called the shadow).

So, the second stage of the individuation is awareness of the shadow. The third stage is meeting still other components of the psyche – called Anima and Animus. The last stage of individuation is the development of the Self, which becomes the new center of the soul, bringing unity and integrating conscious and unconscious material. All the mentioned stages intersect. Because the person constantly and repeatedly returns to old fundamental problems, individuation may be depicted as a spiral in which the person continues once and again to deal with old problems, each time in a more subtle form.

== Modeling of systems of psychological types ==
In modeling of psychological systems the systematization and classification play a very important role. With the development of statistics in the description of weight of the trait (or type) in society, the character of the trait (type) distribution becomes very important. It is also important, if the distinctions of trait have a quantitative or qualitative character for the adequate interpretation of practically every research in the field of differential psychology, understanding of certain fundamental statistical concepts is required. "There are at least three various theories of the psychological types worked out by psychologists. Some authors represent types as separate classes that exclude each other. Some others psychologists accept the theory of types as more or less detailed trait theory, defining the types as poles of one and same continuum between which people may be ranked by the law of normal distribution. The adepts of the third view believe that the types differ from the traits by having multimodal distributions in which the people are grouped with in definite points, representing pure types". Stagner, 1948.

=== Distribution of the traits ===
The normal distribution is fundamental and does not depend on cultural factors. The majority of measuring instruments (tests) are constructed so that the trait could be normalized with the normal distribution term, if distinctions are to have quantitative character. For instance, the traits which enter the base of the personality named the Big Five have a normal distribution.

Example: Extraversion/introversion. Most people have ambivalent characteristics on this scale.

=== Strict sets ===
If characteristics have qualitative rather than quantitative distinctions, they are usually described as strict sets.

Example: Right-handed people and left-handed people. The deaf and the hearing. Types in Socionics.

=== Nonstrict sets ===
It is very seldom that a certain quality is consistently absent in a psyche. Therefore, in most cases, it is useful to use mild classifications which reflect the real character of the distribution more precisely.

Example: Typology by Ernst Kretschmer or William Herbert Sheldon.

=== Complex models ===
More complex and systematized models take into account the fact that they may meet both quantitative, and qualitative distinctions or traits. The distributions of these traits have clear connections and may form types which in term will have a constant distribution in society.

Example: Psycosmology model in the context of the general, typological and individual.

== System classifications ==
The system classifications proceeded from the postulate that the whole is not a sum of its parts, but rather, a system of higher organization. This classification is frequently based on the laws of the functioning Universe. The properties of this classification are: strictness (everyone belongs to one and only one class and remains in it for the whole life), quantity of classes determined by laws of the Universe, and the organization of the psyche as a part of a more general system of a functioning Universe.

Examples: Astrological (Egypt, Babylon, Greece, the Classical antiquity), astro-musical system of types (India).

The foundation of development of practices, known nowadays as "the western astrology", was the Mesopotamian astrology whereas the Chinese tradition became a core of systems so-called "Eastern astrology". As to astrological systems of meso-American Indians and druids, they haven't survived till present time in the living tradition and are now reconstructed only some with some degree of authenticity. Original astrological systems arose, probably, in other regions of the world as well, but they were quite regional (astrology of inks or original Javano-Balyiskian astrology, based on a "vuku" calendar.

An interesting development of this idea can be found in Johannes Kepler's works which continued the traditions of astro-musical systems, having joined physical and mental laws in the theory of resonance.

"In his exposition astrology became similar to the physical theory of resonance. The stars themselves do not influence the destiny of people, but the soul of person at the moment of a birth imprinted the angles between the stars and the following life reacted to them in specific ways".

A somewhat different approach to problems of astrological knowledge can be observed in Carl Jung's works. Astrology, as Jung believed, "is the top of all psychological knowledge in antiquity", the gist of which is in imprinting the symbolical configurations in the form of collective unconscious. "Astrology as collective unconscious to which the psychology addresses, consists of symbolical configurations:" planets "are Gods, the symbols of power unconscious".

Domination of one of the four cognitive functions (thinking, feeling, sensation or intuition) is the basis for the classification that Carl Jung theorized from his clinical experience. This typology was expanded by Aušra Augustinavičiūtė (Socionics) and Isabel Briggs Myers with her mother, Katharine Briggs (Myers-Briggs Type Indicator).

== Specific classifications ==
The classification more often touched on the characteristics connected with the sphere of social interaction. They were built as a set of bipolar traits in which the dominance of certain traits were accentuated in the person's character. The characteristics of specific classifications are the absence of a clear borders between classes—the person can pass from one class into another under the influence of the external and internal forces. The number of classes depends on the position of the author of the classification.

Examples: Socially-characterological (Theophrastus), sociopolitical (Plato).

The Characters by Theophrastus contains thirty brief, vigorous and trenchant outlines of moral types, which form a picture of the life of his time, and of human nature in general.

According to Plato, a state made up of different kinds of souls will, overall, decline from an aristocracy (rule by the best) to a timocracy (rule by the honorable), then to an oligarchy (rule by the few), then to a democracy (rule by the people), and finally to tyranny (rule by one person, rule by a tyrant).

Plato's is one of the first typologies, based on his values. Plato singled out the following types:

1. aristocratic characterized by dominant of the higher side of soul, aspiration to true search;
2. timocratic characterized by strong development of ambition and inclination to struggle;
3. oligarchic characterized by greediness, restraint and thrift;
4. democratic characterized by moral instability, and aspiration to constant change of sensual pleasures;
5. tyrannic characterized by dominant of lowest animal attraction.

The specific classifications are often build by practical workers on the basis of concrete activity. Within any activity one can find many very different classifications.

== Basis of classification ==
The theoretical analysis and empirical verification of the classification systems of the psyche have been undertaken by a number of authors in the 20th century (C. Jung, H. Eysenck, R. Meily, V.S. Merlin, L.N. Sobchik, L.Ja. Dorfman, E.P. Ilyin, N.L. Nagibina and others).

=== Bodily and formal-dynamic characteristics as grounds for classification ===
These classifications are more often used by the clinical psychologists and the psychiatrists.

Example: The Hippocratic school held that four humors: blood, black bile, yellow bile and phlegm consists the basis for the four types of temperaments.

Example: Kretschmer's classification system was based on three main body types: asthenic/leptosomic (thin, small, weak), athletic (muscular, large–boned), and pyknic (stocky, fat). (The athletic category was later combined into the category asthenic/leptosomic.) Each of these body types was associated with certain personality traits and, in a more extreme form, psychopathologies.

Example: American psychologist William Herbert Sheldon associates body types with human temperament types.Sheldon proposed that the human physique be classed according to the relative contribution of three fundamental elements, somatotypes, named after the three germ layers of embryonic development: the endoderm, (develops into the digestive tract), the mesoderm, (becomes muscle, heart and blood vessels), and the ectoderm (forms the skin and nervous system).

Sheldon's "somatotypes" and their supposed associated physical traits can be summarized as follows:

Ectomorphic: characterized by long and thin muscles/limbs and low fat storage; receding chin, usually referred to as slim.

Mesomorphic: characterized by medium bones, solid torso, low fat levels, wide shoulders with a narrow waist; usually referred to as muscular.

Endomorphic: characterized by increased fat storage, a wide waist and a large bone structure, usually referred to as fat.

=== Cognitive characteristics as a basis for classification ===
Cognitive characteristics as a basis for classification become popular in the 20th century.

Table 1. Some examples of classifications based on concrete methods of receiving and processing information.

| Basis of classification | Interpretation | Authors |
|---|---|---|
| Analytical (differentiating) / Synthetical (integrating) | Analyticals tend to perceive separate parts and properties, and have difficulty catching whole structures oriented on distinctions. Synthetics tend to perceive the phenomena as an integrated whole, seeing the similarities in the parts. | Gottshald, 1914 Rorschach, 1921 |
| Thinkers / Artists | In thinkers, the second signal system is dominant. In artists, the first signal system is dominant. | Pavlov, 1927 |
| Objectivists / Subjectivists | The objectivists are characterized by steady, narrowly directed and precise perception. The subjectivists are characterized by a broader field of perception, with subjective interpretation supplementing perception. | Angyal, 1948 |
| Rationals / Irrationals | Rationals go by a defined set of criteria via logic or value as their primary mode of functioning. Irrationals go by mere events via sensations and intuitions as their primary mode of functioning. | Jung, 1902 |

=== Values and motivational characteristics as grounds for personality classifications ===
The sphere of personality values and senses is situated at the crossing point of two large areas of psychic: motivation on one side and the world outlooking structure on the other. The sphere of values and senses with its unique picture of the world is the core of personality. Most bright psychological ideas concerning the sphere values and senses are presented in the work of Erich Fromm, M. Rokeach, Abraham Maslow and others.

For example, Rokeach treats the values as a kind of steady conviction that a certain goal or way of living is preferable to some other. The human values are characterized by the following main properties:

1. The whole number of values of a person is relatively small.
2. All people have the same values, although in different degrees.
3. The values are organized in systems.
4. The sources of human values can be tracked down in culture, society and its institutions etc.
5. The influence of the values can be traced practically in all social phenomena, deserving studying.

Rokeach distinguishes two classes of values – terminal and instrumental. He defines the terminal values as convictions that a certain final goal in individual life (for instance, happy family life, peace in the whole world) from the personal and the social point of view is worth to be pursued. The instrumental values are beliefs that a certain way of performance (for instant, honesty, rationalism) is from personal and social points of view preferable in any situations. In fact, the distinction between the terminal and instrumental values coincides with already existing, rather traditional differentiations of values-goals and values means. The system of personality values orientation as well as any psychological system can be represented as "multidimensional dynamic space".

Example: Erich Fromm describes the ways an individual relates to the world and constitutes his general character, and develops from two specific kinds of relatedness to the world: acquiring and assimilating things ("assimilation"), and reacting to people ("socialization"). These orientations describe how a person has developed in regard to how he responds to conflicts in his or her life; he also considered that people were never pure in any such orientation. These two factors form four types of malignant character, which he calls Receptive, Exploitative, Hoarding and Marketing. He also described a positive character, which he called Productive.

Example: N.Losski picked out three types of characters.

1. Hedonistic type with domination of lower, sensual drives suppressing all higher aspirations. The people of this type are completely under the influence of the biological nature. Their self is not yet mature.
2. Egoistic type. Their self is quite mature and decorates all the striving deeds and feelings. The Self (I) prevails in their consciousness and they are striving to broadly expose it in their activities.
3. Superpersonal type. Their aspirations similarly to those of the first type, are as if given outside, but their source is not in the physical needs of the body, but in the factors of higher order, namely: in higher religious, scientific and aesthetic strivings. Such people act as if not on behalf of themselves, but on behalf of the higher will, which they recognize as the rules of their deeds.

Losski points out that it is impossible the sharp boundary between the three types, as there are intermediate types, that are transitional from one category to the other.

=== Bounded complexes of cognitive characteristics, values and motives as ground for personality classifications ===
Example: E. Spranger distinguishes six types of personality, which connect cognition and values correlating the personality type with cognition of the world.

- The Theoretical, whose dominant interest is the discovery of truth. A passion to discover, systematize and analyze; a search for knowledge.
- The Economic, who is interested in what is useful. A passion to gain a return on all investments involving time, money and resources.
- The Aesthetic, whose highest value is form and harmony. A passion to experience impressions of the world and achieve form and harmony in life; self-actualization.
- The Social, whose highest value is love of people. A passion to invest myself, my time, and my resources into helping others achieve their potential.
- The Political, whose interest is primarily in power. A passion to achieve position and to use that position to affect and influence others.
- The Religious, whose highest value is unity. A passion to seek out and pursue the highest meaning in life, in the divine or the ideal, and achieve a system for living.

One dominating value corresponding to every type.

== Contemporary problems of psychological classifications ==
The problems of psychological classifications are caused the high complexity and mobility of psyche. To classify the objects of the material world is more easy a task.

In psychology we study consciousness with the help of consciousness. Here new possibilities are opened and the same time new limitations occurred, in part, due to the subjectivity and the necessity to overcome it as it is known, in the psyche there are conscious and unconscious cognitive processes. They often take place separately, as two different means to get knowledge (information) about situations in the world. Because of this, for instance, estimations of personality characteristics with the help of projective tests (which are addressed mostly to unconscious properties) often contradict the results of self-estimations made with help of questionnaires (which are based on consciousness).

For determining of psychological type of a person, it is important to have a measuring instrument (test, inventory etc.), that is calibrated to reveal not the present and actual situational characteristics, but the opens which are typical, repeating with higher probability in the course of life. That is why the methods, which allow to see the present characteristics through the prism of the person whole life: biographical, structured talk, longitudinal observation in real situations) are very important for the psychologists. Such methods are well developed in the clinical psychology. In the work with healthy people the use of these methods is rather narrow.

Example: The program of personality measuring by A.F. Lazurski.

Training qualified specialists in the field of research and diagnostics of psychological types is a particular problem. Here a whole complex of specific knowledge and skills is required. For measuring psychological types it is important to have the ability to see not separate fragments of the psychic reality but operating with the systems (cognition, motivation, values, will, emotions, self-consciousness) and taking into account their holistic character, to master the knowledge of steady variants of these systems and skills to compare their properties. The comparing and estimating the systems are more difficult in the absence of the reliable methodological base: there is not a generally accepted opinion on what to compare and how to estimate.

For investigation the types it is necessary to be able to use both the qualitative and quantitative methods of empirical reality research, taking into account the following factors:

1. The scale and the complex character of research (the possibility of keeping under control several plans of different scales).

2. The character and specificity of distribution of properties and characteristics in the studied environment.

3. The adequate number of sub-scales, not violating the completeness and the constructive validity of a psychological traits.

== List of important theorists of psychological typology and differential psychology ==
- Alfred Adler
- Anne Anastasi
- Claudio Naranjo
- Raymond Cattell
- Hans Eysenck
- Sigmund Freud
- Franz Joseph Gall
- Francis Galton
- Hippocrates
- Karen Horney
- Edmund Husserl
- William James
- Carl Jung
- Ernst Kretschmer
- Oswald Külpe
- Karl Leonhard
- Cesare Lombroso
- Isabel Briggs Myers
- Ivan Pavlov
- Nikolai Lossky
- Grigory Ivanovich Rossolimo
- Plato
- Théodule-Armand Ribot
- Hermann Rorschach
- William Stern
- Theophrastus

== See also ==
- Hermeneutics
- Heterophenomenology
- Personhood Theory
- Differential psychology
- Phenomenology (psychology)
- Philosophical Anthropology
- Personology
- Psychological types
- Personality psychology
- Psychometrics
- Socionics
- Rationality
- Irrationality
- Personality type
- 16PF
- Adjective Check List (ACL)
- BarOn EQ-i
- Big Five personality traits
- Birkman Method
- CPI 260
- DISC assessment
- Enneagram of Personality
- Interpersonal compatibility
- Keirsey Temperament Sorter
- List of personality tests
- Minnesota Multiphasic Personality Inventory (MMPI)
- Myers-Briggs Type Indicator
- NEO
- OCEAN
- Strong Interest Inventory
- Thomas Kilmann Conflict Mode Instrument
- Jungian Type Index
- Jung Type Indicator

== Bibliography ==
- Anastasi, A. (1981). Differential psychology. (4th ed.). New York: Macmillan.
- Asendorpf, J. B. (2003). "Head-to-head comparison of the predictive validity of personality types and dimensions". European Journal of Personality. 17 (5): 327–346. doi:10.1002/per.492.
- Bates, K. L. (2006). Type A personality not linked to heart disease. Retrieved 2006-11-05.
- Daniels, David; and Price, Virginia (Updated and Revised 2009). The Essential Enneagram: Test and Self-Discovery Guide. HarperOne. ISBN 0-06-251676-0.
- Furnham, A.; Crump, J. (2005). "Personality Traits, Types, and Disorders: An Examination of the Relationship Between Three Self-Report Measures". European Journal of Personality. 19 (3): 167–184. doi:10.1002/per.543.
- Kagan, J. (1994). Galen's Prophecy: Temperament in Human Nature. New York: Basic Books.
- Keirsey, David (1 May 1998) [1978]. Please Understand Me II: Temperament, Character, Intelligence (1st Ed. ed.). Prometheus Nemesis Book Co. pp. 3. ISBN 1-885705-02-6.
- Pittenger, D. J. (2004). "The limitations of extracting typologies from trait measures of personality". Personality and Individual Differences. 37 (4): 779–787. doi:10.1016/j.paid.2003.10.006.
- McCrae, R. R.; Terracciano, A.; Costa, P. T.; Ozer, D. J. (2006). "Person-factors in the California adult Q-set: Closing the door on personality types?". European Journal of Personality. 20: 29–44. doi:10.1002/per.553.
- McCrae, R. M.; John, O. P. (1992). "An introduction to the five-factor model and its applications" (PDF). Journal of Personality. 60 (2): 175–215. doi:10.1111/j.1467-6494.1992.tb00970.x. PMID 1635039.
- Myers, Isabel Briggs with Peter B. Myers (1980, 1995). Gifts Differing: Understanding Personality Type. Mountain View, CA: Davies-Black Publishing. pp. xi–xii. ISBN 0-89106-074-X.
- William H. Sheldon, The varieties of human physique: An introduction to constitutional psychology (New York: Harper & Brothers, 1940).
- William H. Sheldon, Atlas of Men. New York: Harper and Brothers, 1954.
- Jung, Carl (1976). Campbell, Joseph. ed. The Portable Jung. New York, NY: Penguin Books. pp. 178.
- Jung, C.G. ([1921] 1971). Psychological Types, Collected Works, Volume 6, Princeton, N.J.: Princeton University Press. ISBN 0-691-01813-8.

In German language

- Ernst Kretschmer Körperbau und Charakter. Untersuchungen zum Konstitutionsproblem und zur Lehre von den Temperamenten. Springer Berlin 1921
- Martin Priwitzer. und das Wahnproblem
- Karl Leonhard Classification of Endogenous Psychoses and their Differentiated Etiology, 2nd edition edited by Helmut Beckmann. New York/Wien: Springer-Verlag 1999 ISBN 3-211-83259-9
- Die Populäre Psychologie der Typen. Teil 1 /W.Red. N. Nagibina. Berlin, 2010

In Russian language

- Abulkhanova-Slavskaya K.A. Life Strategy. Moscow, 1991.
- Abulkhanova-Slavskaya K.A. Typology of Personality Activity. // Psychological Journal, 1985, Vol. 6, No. 5, pp. 3–18.
- Anastasi Anna. Differential Psychology. Moscow, 2001.
- Artemtseva N.G., Gubankova N.G., Ilyasov I.I., Mironycheva A.V., Nagibina N.L. Psychological Types. Cognitive Styles. Part 4. Moscow University for the Humanities, 2003.
- Artemtseva N.G., Ilyasov I.I., Mironycheva A.V., Nagibina N.L. Fiveisky V.Yu. Cognition and Personality: A Typological Approach. Moscow, Book and Business, 2004
- Bubnova, S.S. A Systems Approach to the Study of the Psychology of Individuality. Moscow, 2002.
- Dorfman, L.Ya. The Meta-Individual World. Moscow, 1993.
- Ilyin, E.P. The Psychology of Individual Differences. "Piter", 2004.
- Kepler, I. On More Reliable Foundations of Astrology. / Hermeticism, Magic, and Natural Philosophy in European Culture of the 13th-19th Centuries. Moscow, 1999.
- Klimov, E.A. The Image of the World in Different Professions. Moscow, 1995.
- Kutalev, Denis. Astrology as a Historical and Cultural Phenomenon. Dissertation for the degree of Candidate of Sciences in the specialty "Theory and History of Culture".
- Cognitive Styles: Abstracts of the All-Union Scientific Seminar. Tallinn, 1986.
- Kretschmer, E. Body Structure and Character / Psychology and Psychoanalysis of Character. Reader. Samara, 1997.
- Cooper, K. Individual Differences. Moscow, 2000.
- Lazursky, A.F. Essays on the Science of Character. Moscow, 1995.
- Leonhard, K. Accentuated Personalities. Kyiv, 1981.
- Libin, A.V. Differential Psychology: At the Intersection of European, Russian, and American Traditions. Moscow, 1999.
- Lossky, N.O. Conditions of Absolute Good. Moscow, 1991.
- Marutaev, M.A. Harmony as a Pattern of Nature / The Golden Section. Moscow, 1990, pp. 130–233.
- Meili, R. The Structure of Personality / Paul Fress, Jean Piaget. Experimental Psychology. Issue 5, Moscow, Progress, 1975.
- Melnikov, V. M., Yampolsky, L. T. Introduction to the Experimental Psychology of Personality. Moscow, 1985.
- Merlin, V. S. Outline of an Integral Study of Personality. Moscow, 1986.
- Models of the World. (ed. D. A. Pospelov). Moscow, 1997.
- Nagibina, N. L., Artemtseva, N. G., Grekova, T. N. Psychology of Art. A Typological Approach. Moscow, Moscow State University of the Humanities, 2005.
- Nagibina, N. L. Psychology of Types. A Systems Approach. Psychodiagnostic Methods. Part 1. Moscow, Institute of Youth, 2000.
- Nagibina, N. L., Mironycheva, A. V. Psychology of Types. A Systems Approach. Body and Soul. Part 2. Moscow, Moscow Humanitarian and Social Academy, 2002.
- Nagibina, N. L., Grekova, T. N. Psychology of Types. Development Strategies. Part 3. Moscow, Moscow Humanitarian and Social Academy, 2002.
- Neuhaus, G. The Art of Piano Playing. Moscow, 2000.
- Petrov, V. M., Gribkov, V. S., Kamensky, V. S. To Test Harmony... by Experiment. / Number and Thought. Moscow, 1980. Vol. 3, pp. 145–168.
- Plato. Personal Works in 4 Volumes, Vol. 1, Moscow, 1990.
- Psychology of Individual Differences: Texts. (Ed. by Yu.B. Gippenreiter, V.Ya. Romanov), Moscow, 1982.
- Popular Psychology of Types Part 1 / ed. by N.L. Nagibina. IIDP, Moscow, 2009
- Rossolimo G.I. Psychological Profiles. Methodology. Moscow, 1910.
- Sobchik L.N. Psychology of Individuality. Theory and Practice of Psychodiagnostics. St. Petersburg, 2005.
- Semira and V. Vetash. Astrology in Images and Analogies of the World. Barnaul, 1993.
- Teplov B.M., Nebylitsin V.D. Study of the Basic Properties of the Nervous System and Their Significance for the Psychology of Individual Differences. // Voprosy Psychologii. 1963, No. 5.
- Torshilova E.M. Can Harmony Be Verified by Algebra? (Critique of "Experimental Aesthetics"). Moscow, 1988.
- Fragments of Early Greek Philosophers. Part 1, Moscow, 1989.
- Shadrikov, V.D. Abilities in the Structure of the Psyche. / Diagnostics of Cognitive Abilities. Yaroslavl, 1986.
- Jung, K. Psychological Types. Moscow, 1995.
