= Brain types =

Estimation of athletic ability

Brain typing is a system developed by Jonathan P. Niednagel that applies elements from neuroscience, physiology, and psychology to estimate athletic ability. It is based on the psychological typology of Carl Jung and the later work of Katharine Cook Briggs and Isabel Briggs Myers. Currently, no controlled experiments have been done to assess the effectiveness of Brain Typing (though there are anecdotal reports of both successes and failures, along with a pilot study on blood samples conducted in conjunction with Divyen H. Patel of Genome Explorations), and as a result the American Psychological Association considers Brain Typing a pseudoscience.

What separates brain typing from Jungian typology and its offshoots, such as the Myers–Briggs Type Indicator (MBTI) and socionics, is its emphasis on motor skills. Each of the sixteen brain types is said to specialize in certain regions of the brain responsible for varying degrees of mental and motor skills. Niednagel believes the types are inherited, possessing a genetic basis. The brain types website and books also explain how it differs from the Myers-Briggs Type Indicator in that it believes the ENTP/FCIR type is by far the most common of the sixteen types, whereas some other types presumed as common in the Myers-Briggs Type Indicator, such as the ISTJ/BEIL, are actually only about 3% of the populace according to their estimates.

Brain types have been criticized by the American Psychological Association as not valid and built for commercial purposes only.

== History ==
Niednagel began to develop Brain Typing in the late 1970s and 1980s while coaching youth soccer, basketball, and Little League baseball. He observed that children with similar personalities also tended to have similar motor skills. Niednagel began to receive more attention for his work in the 1990s, particularly in the arena of professional sports. An event related to brain typing was Niednagel's prediction in 1998 that Peyton Manning would become a star quarterback in the National Football League (NFL), and that the similarly hyped Ryan Leaf would perform poorly in the league. His prediction came true as Peyton Manning has become one of football's best quarterbacks while Ryan Leaf is remembered as one of the worst busts in football draft history. Not all of Niednagel's predictions have been as clear cut, as he is careful to qualify his projections. His success rate has gained him a following, and allowed him to apply his work in professional sports for nearly 20 years.

Despite the effort and study that Niednagel has put into Brain Types, it has yet to be validated via scientific journals or publications. He has conducted and continues to engage in genetic testing with private biotech companies in the search for irrefutable validation on a genetic level. However, although Brain Typing began as a way to assess athletes and athletic ability, Niednagel has since broadened his field to include advice for relationships, parenting, business, education, spirituality from a conservative Reformed Calvinist perspective, and health issues, including weight loss.

== Brain types and motor skills ==
Niednagel divides the types into four basic motor skill groupings using his own terminology (originally derived from Jung/Myers) which he believes is more precise: EA, EI, CA, and CI. EA, or 'Empirical-Animate' types (FEAL, FEAR, BEAL, BEAR), are said to excel in the region of the brain responsible for gross motor skills. EI, or 'Empirical-Inanimate' types (FEIL, FEIR, BEIL, BEIR) are thought to possess the best fine motor skills of the four groups. CA, or 'Conceptual-Animate' types (FCAL, FCAR, BCAL, BCAR), excel in the auditory cortex, which is responsible for controlling the mouth and various hearing/language skills. CI, or 'Conceptual-Inanimate' types (FCIL, FCIR, BCIL, BCIR), are believed to excel in the cerebral cortex, where abstract levels of reasoning occur, along with the diaphragm region, responsible for voice production and breathing.

== Commercialization and criticism ==
Educational society and members of American Psychological Association criticize Brain Types as not valid and built for commercial purposes only. Mr. Niednagel, a lay-scientist of 30 years, with a bachelor's degree in Business Finance from California State University, Long Beach, says his method is the most accurate (in applying the Jungian/Myers model) and verifiable. He believes that, when he has had the time, he has had 100% accuracy rate in assessing and localizing brain functioning on the basis of "eyeballing" and then analyzing body language, posture, motor activity, and speech. These claims, however, remain disputable. Current knowledge of the use of fMRIs, transcranial magnetic stimulation, and electroencephalography to monitor brain waves and brain function makes the idea of having the ability to look at someone and determine features of their brain far too simplistic.

Terry Sandbek, primary contact of the Sacramento Skeptics Society, in his publication Brain Typing: The Pseudoscience of Cold Reading criticized the validity of Brain Types and claimed "how closely the Brain Typing of Jonathan P. Niednagel fits as a pseudoscience".

== Sources ==
- Niednagel, Jonathan P. (2002); Your Key to Sports Success. Laguna Niguel: Laguna Press, 2002; 7th edition
