= John Beebe =

American psychologist

John Beebe (born June 24, 1939) is an American psychiatrist and Jungian analyst in practice in San Francisco.

Beebe was born in Washington, D.C. He received degrees from Harvard College and the University of Chicago medical school. He is a past president of the C. G. Jung Institute of San Francisco, where he is currently on the teaching faculty. He is a Distinguished Life Fellow of the American Psychiatric Association.

== Professional interests and activities ==
A popular lecturer in the Jungian world, Beebe has spoken on topics related to the theory and practical applications of Analytical psychology to professional and lay audiences throughout the United States and around the world. He has been especially active in introducing training in Jungian psychology in China. Beebe is the founding editor of The San Francisco Jung Institute Library Journal, now called Jung Journal: Culture & Psyche. He was the first American co-editor of the London-based Journal of Analytical Psychology.

Beebe has also published in The Chiron Clinical Series, Fort Da, Harvest, The Inner Edge, Journal of Jungian Theory and Practice, Psychoanalytic Psychology, Psychological Perspectives, The Psychoanalytic Review, Quadrant, Spring, The Journal of Popular Film and Television, Theory and Psychology, and Tikkun among others. He has contributed book chapters to The Anne Rice Reader, The Cambridge Companion to Jung, From Tradition to Innovation, House, Humanizing Evil, Initiation, Jungian Perspectives on Clinical Supervision, New Approaches to Dream Interpretation, Post-Jungians Today, Psyche & City, The Psychology of Mature Spirituality, Same-Sex Love, The Soul of Popular Culture, and Teaching Jung.

With Donald Sandner, Beebe is the author of "Psychopathology and Analysis", an article on Jungian complex theory used in many training programs, and with Thomas Kirsch and Joe Cambray the author of "What Freudians Can Learn from Jung". He is the author of the book Integrity in Depth, a study of the archetype of integrity, and of Energies and Patterns in Psychological Type: The Reservoir of Consciousness.

== Eight-function model ==
Beebe is particularly interested in the way an understanding of typology can foster the development of the capacity to take responsibility for our impact on others. Following up on Jung's theory of psychological types, where the contrasting attitudes of extraversion and introversion colored the judging (rational) functions of thinking and feeling, and the perceiving (irrational) functions of intuition and sensation, he developed an archetypal model of a dialogical self wherein conscious functions contend with more unconscious complexes in the shadow. A person's dominant (most preferred) function is the “hero” (or "heroine"), which is most closely allied with a semi-conscious complex called the “anima” (or "animus"). The hero is also challenged by an “opposing personality”. The next most preferred, or auxiliary, function is the good parent, which may be counteracted by a shadowy witch/senex complex; similarly the tertiary function (“child”) may be undermined by a more juvenile “trickster”. Finally, the anima may find itself forced to compete with a demonic personality function which threatens to destroy it. A discussion and explanation of this model can be found in C. G. Jung, Isabel Myers, John Beebe and the Guide Map to Becoming Who We Are, by Mark Hunziker (2017) ISBN 978-0-99760760-4 and in Building Blocks of Personality Type, by Leona Haas and Mark Hunziker (2006) ISBN 978-0-9719326-2-3, pp. 177–179.

Jungian cognitive functions used in the Eight-function model
	Feeling	Intuition	Sensing	Thinking
Introverted	Fi Introverted Feeling	Ni Introverted Intuition	Si Introverted Sensing	Ti Introverted Thinking
Extroverted	Fe Extroverted Feeling	Ne Extroverted Intuition	Se Extroverted Sensing	Te Extroverted Thinking

The archetypal roles of different Jungian cognitive functions according to Beebe's model
Type	ISTJ	ISFJ	INFJ	INTJ
1st - Hero/Heroine	Si	Si	Ni	Ni
2nd - Good Parent	Te	Fe	Fe	Te
3rd - Puer/Puella	Fi	Ti	Ti	Fi
4th - Anima/Animus	Ne	Ne	Se	Se
5th - Opposing Personality	Se	Se	Ne	Ne
6th - Senex/Witch	Ti	Fi	Fi	Ti
7th - Trickster	Fe	Te	Te	Fe
8th - Daemon	Ni	Ni	Si	Si
Type	ISTP	ISFP	INFP	INTP
1st - Hero/Heroine	Ti	Fi	Fi	Ti
2nd - Good Parent	Se	Se	Ne	Ne
3rd - Puer/Puella	Ni	Ni	Si	Si
4th - Anima/Animus	Fe	Te	Te	Fe
5th - Opposing Personality	Te	Fe	Fe	Te
6th - Senex/Witch	Si	Si	Ni	Ni
7th - Trickster	Ne	Ne	Se	Se
8th - Daemon	Fi	Ti	Ti	Fi
Type	ESTP	ESFP	ENFP	ENTP
1st - Hero/Heroine	Se	Se	Ne	Ne
2nd - Good Parent	Ti	Fi	Fi	Ti
3rd - Puer/Puella	Fe	Te	Te	Fe
4th - Anima/Animus	Ni	Ni	Si	Si
5th - Opposing Personality	Si	Si	Ni	Ni
6th - Senex/Witch	Te	Fe	Fe	Te
7th - Trickster	Fi	Ti	Ti	Fi
8th - Daemon	Ne	Ne	Se	Se
Type	ESTJ	ESFJ	ENFJ	ENTJ
1st - Hero/Heroine	Te	Fe	Fe	Te
2nd - Good Parent	Si	Si	Ni	Ni
3rd - Puer/Puella	Ne	Ne	Se	Se
4th - Anima/Animus	Fi	Ti	Ti	Fi
5th - Opposing Personality	Ti	Fi	Fi	Ti
6th - Senex/Witch	Se	Se	Ne	Ne
7th - Trickster	Ni	Ni	Si	Si
8th - Daemon	Fe	Te	Te	Fe

== Publications ==
- Psychiatric Treatment: Crisis, Clinic and Consultation, with C. Peter Rosenbaum (1975) ISBN 0-07-053710-0
- Money, Food, Drink, Fashion, and Analytic Training (the proceedings of the Eighth International Congress of Analytical Psychology), editor (1983) ISBN 3-87089-304-4
- Aspects of the Masculine, a collection of Jung's essays, editor with a critical introduction (1989) ISBN 0-691-01884-7
- Integrity in Depth. 1992. ISBN 0-89096-493-9. Archived from the original on 2012-10-22 – via Questia.
- Terror, Violence and the Impulse to Destroy (a collection of papers from the North American Conference of Jungian Analysts and Candidates, San Francisco, September, 2002), editor (2003) ISBN 3-85630-628-5
- The Presence of the Feminine in Film, with Virginia Apperson (2008) ISBN 9-781847-184467
- The Question of Psychological Types: The Correspondence of C. G. Jung and Hans Schmid-Guisan, 1915-1916, co-editor with Ernst Falzeder (2013). ISBN 978-0-691-15561-6
- Energies and Patterns in Psychological Type: The Reservoir of Consciousness (2017) ISBN 978-1-138-92228-0

== See also ==
- Psychological Types
- Myers–Briggs Type Indicator
- Keirsey Temperament Sorter
