= JTI =

JTI may refer to:

- Japan Tobacco International, a multinational tobacco corporation
- Join the Impact, an American LGBT political movement
- Journal of Japanese Trade & Industry, now called Japan Spotlight
- Journal of Theological Interpretation
- Jubail Technical Institute, in Saudi Arabia
- Jungian Type Indicator, a psychometric questionnaire to assess personality types
- University of Virginia Japanese Text Initiative
- Veermata Jijabai Technological Institute, formerly Victoria Jubilee Technical Institute, Mumbai
- Jamalpur Textile Institute, a public textile institute in Bangladesh
