= Elazar Rokeach =

Elazar Rokeach, Elazar Rokeiach, Eleazar Rokeach, Eleazar Rokeah, or Eleazar Roḳeaḥ may refer to:

- Eleazar of Worms (c. 1176 – 1238), Talmudist and kabbalist
- Elazar Rokeach of Amsterdam, (c. 1665–1742), European rabbi
