= Edward Hay =

Edward Hay may refer to:

- Edward Hay (diplomat) (fl. 1700s), British diplomat and governor of Barbados
- Edward Hay (County Wexford) (1761–1826), author of a book on the Irish Rebellion of 1798
- Edward Hay (politician) (1840–1918), politician in Manitoba, Canada
- Lord Edward Hay (1888–1944), British soldier
- Edward Norman Hay (1889–1943), composer and musicologist
- Edward N. Hay (died 1958), businessman based in Philadelphia, Pennsylvania
- Edward Hay, 13th Marquess of Tweeddale (1947–2005)

== See also ==
- Edward Drummond-Hay (antiquarian) (1785–1845), British antiquarian and diplomat
- Edward Drummond-Hay (Royal Navy officer) (1815–1884), British naval officer, diplomat and colonial administrator
- Edward Hayes (disambiguation)
- Edward Hays (disambiguation)
