= Gifts Differing =

1980 book by Isabel Briggs Myers with Peter B. Myers

Gifts Differing: Understanding Personality Type is a 1980 book written by Isabel Briggs Myers and Peter B. Myers, about the psychological type model originally developed by C. G. Jung as adapted and embodied in the Myers–Briggs Type Indicator (MBTI) personality test. This typological model uses psychological type differences. Profiles also suggest how people of each type tend to act and relate to people with other type dynamics.

== See also ==
- Quiet: The Power of Introverts in a World That Can't Stop Talking

== Bibliography ==
- Myers, Isabel Briggs with Peter B. Myers, (Original edition 1980; Reprint edition 1995), Gifts Differing: Understanding Personality Type, Davies-Black Publishing, 248 pages, ISBN 0-89106-074-X
