= Subsolid personality =

Personality type

Subsolid personality is a personality type which lacks firmness and a consistent identity. The person's desire for personality prevents proper coordination in order to achieve their goals.

A subsolid person senses anxiously how the environment reacts to their actions; the person takes on the color of the environment and chooses, or is influenced by, whatever the way of appearing that serves them best. The actions of the person lack consistency, and their emotional life is labile. The subsolid person is the charmer and the hysteric - happy and successful as long as they are able to attune themselves to the psychological climate of the environment. But the person is fickle, like a chameleon, and reacts docilely and sensitively on predominant opinions and absorbs them. Lacking any substance of their own, adapting a pose is what becomes important; they develop a need to dramatize and attract attention.

Someone with a subsolid personality may be perceived as quick, agile, histrionic, erratic, unpredictable, subjective, impulsive, and labile.

The concept originates from Henrik Sjöbring's personality model, developed in Personality Structure and Development: A Model and its Application.
