= Edward N. Hay =

American businessman

Edward Northup Hay (1891 - 1958) was a businessman based in Philadelphia, Pennsylvania.

He was for years the head personnel officer for First Pennsylvania Bank in Philadelphia. There, he was a mentor to Isabel Briggs Myers, whom he taught test construction, scoring, validation, and statistics, and who went on to develop the Myers-Briggs Type Indicator.

During World War II, Hay served as Deputy Administrator for the Office of Price Administration.

In 1943, he launched Hay Group, a management consultancy that focused on improving the personnel side of businesses, which he believed was a neglected and underdeveloped area. He wrote:

The human element in industry has not received adequate or sufficiently skillful attention. ... The most successful companies of the future will be the ones that take full advantage of improved personnel techniques.

In 1945, Hay got his first major contract, from General Foods Corporation to study and evaluate 450 management jobs. He resigned from First Pennsylvania Bank and incorporated his company.

Hay died unexpectedly in 1958 at the age of 67. His company, Hay Group, is still active.
