= Katharine Briggs =

Katharine Briggs may refer to:

- Katharine Mary Briggs (1898–1980), British author of various books on fairies and folklore
- Katharine Cook Briggs (1875–1968), American writer, co-inventor of the Myers-Briggs Type Indicator
