= Henrik Sjöbring =

Swedish physician and professor of psychiatry

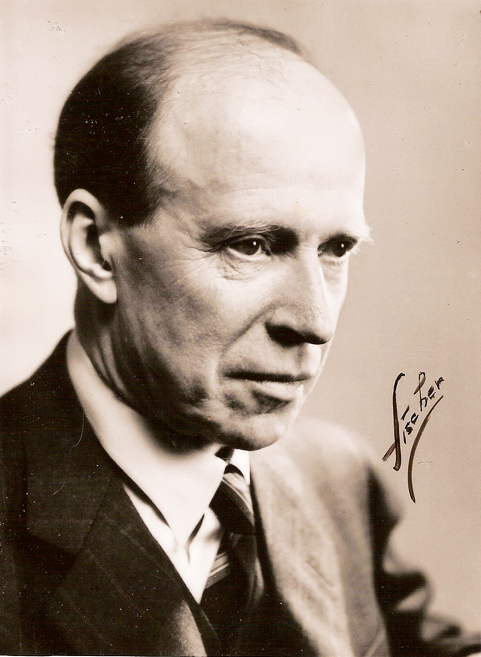
Henrik Sjöbring.

Per Henrik Nils Sjöbring (9 July 1879 – 19 February 1956) was a Swedish physician and professor of psychiatry.

Sjöbring was born in Aringsås, Sweden. He received his doctorate in 1913 at Uppsala University and was a professor of psychiatry at the University of Lund 1930–1944. He has become best known for his variables for description of personality types. His so-called constitution factors (known as Sjöbring's theory of constitution) are called:

1. Capacity (intelligence, aptitude)
2. Validity (mental energy, alertness)
3. Stability (potential, tenacity)
4. Solidity (firmness, retainability)

By means of these variables, all people can be categorized as either normal, super- or sub-; for instance subcapable (unintelligent), subvalid (lack of mental energy), normosolid, superstable, and so on.

== See also ==
- Subsolid personality

== Bibliography ==
- Personality Structure and Development: A Model and its Application, Copenhagen, 1973 (Swedish original 1958).
