= State-Trait Anxiety Inventory =

Psychological inventory

- Purpose: measures 2 types of anxiety

The State-Trait Anxiety Inventory (STAI) is a psychological inventory consisting of 40 self-report items on a 4-point Likert scale. The STAI measures two types of anxiety – state anxiety and trait anxiety. Higher scores are positively correlated with higher levels of anxiety. Its most current revision is Form Y and it is offered in more than 40 languages.

The STAI was developed by psychologists Charles Spielberger, R.L. Gorsuch, and R.E. Lushene. Their goal in creating the inventory was to create a set of questions that could be applied towards differentiating between the temporary condition of "state anxiety" and the more general and long-standing quality of "trait anxiety." This was a new development because all other questionnaires focused on one type of anxiety at the time.

Spielberger also created other self-report state-trait scales purported to measure various other emotions and dispositions. These include the State-Trait Anger Scale (STAS) and the State-Trait Anger Expression Inventory (STAXI). Alternate forms of the STAI have been developed, including a short-form version (STAI-6) as well as a child form, the State-Trait Anxiety Inventory for Children (STAIC).

The STAI requires a sixth grade reading level. It is used to aid diagnosis in clinical and other medical settings, including the differential diagnosis of anxiety and depression.

== History ==
Charles Spielberger was not alone in creating the STAI, R.L. Gorsuch, and R.E. Lushene also contributed to its development. It underwent revision to its current form in 1983. It was developed as a method to assess two types of anxiety, state and trait, in the fields of practice and research. The inventory was developed in a way so that it could be one set of questions that when given the proper direction, could be applied towards the assessment of a specific type of anxiety. Some of the information used in the inventory was taken from other forms of measurement, and in the case of The Affect Adjective Check List (AACL), was even subject to the slight change of its current adjectives. After the inventory had been developed it underwent research to determine if it could be concluded as a valid source of assessment before it could be taken any further.

== The State-Trait Anxiety Inventory ==
The State Trait Anxiety Inventory is a test/questionnaire given to adults that shows how strong a person’s feelings of anxiety are. It is offered and translated in twelve languages: English, Chinese, Danish, Dutch, Finnish, French, Italian, Norwegian, Portuguese, Spanish, Swedish, and Thai. It was developed to provide both short and reliable scales based on a person's answers to access state and trait anxiety.

Feelings of unease, worry, tension, and stress can be defined as anxiety. It is usually accompanied by a situation that causes these feelings for example, a big test or interview. Also, prisoners can experience such symptoms. It can also be caused by anxiety disorders such as Obsessive Compulsive Disorder (OCD) or Generalized Anxiety Disorder (GAD). The STAI tests two different types of anxiety, state and trait anxiety.

State anxiety (S-anxiety) can be defined as fear, nervousness, discomfort, etc. and the arousal of the autonomic nervous system induced by different situations that are perceived as dangerous. This type of anxiety refers more to how a person is feeling at the time of a perceived threat and is considered temporary.

Trait anxiety (T-anxiety) can be defined as feelings of stress, worry, discomfort, etc. that one experiences on a day to day basis. This is usually perceived as how people feel across typical situations that everyone experiences on a daily basis.

== Forms ==
This inventory is made up of 40 questions, and distinguishes between a person’s state anxiety and their trait anxiety. The two forms of anxiety are separated in the inventory, and both are given their own 20 separate questions. When participants rate themselves on these questions, they are given a 4-point frequency scale. The frequency scales differ between the two types of anxiety. There are two main forms of the Inventory, Form X and Form Y.

Form X of the STAI was revised from the original STAI to develop a better way of measuring both state and trait anxieties. This was done in order to better differentiate between patients suffering from anxiety and depressive disorders when being diagnosed. By revising the STAI, many questions from the original inventory were replaced.

Form Y of the STAI was constructed by replacing items from Form X. By doing so, Form Y in turn has better defined state and trait anxiety factors. The major difference between Form X and Form Y is that Form Y has a better simple structure, as well as the anxiety factors being better differentiated and stable than Form X. This form of the STAI is currently being used more often than the original Form X.

== Scoring ==
The State-Trait Anxiety Inventory is one of the first tests to assess both state and trait anxiety separately. Each type of anxiety has its own scale of 20 different questions that are scored. Scores range from 20 to 80, with higher scores correlating with greater anxiety. The creators of this test separated the different anxieties so both scales would be reliable. This means the S-anxiety scale would only measure S-anxiety and the T-anxiety scale would only measure T-anxiety, the ultimate goal in creating this test. They found they could not achieve this if the questions were the same to examine both types of anxiety. Each scale asks twenty questions each and are rated on a 4-point scale. Low scores indicate a mild form of anxiety and high scores indicate a severe form of anxiety. Both scales have anxiety absent and anxiety present questions. Anxiety absent questions represent the absence of anxiety in a statement like, “I feel secure.” Anxiety present questions represent the presence of anxiety in a statement like “I feel worried.” More examples from the STAI on anxiety absent and present questions are listed below. Each measure has a different rating scale. The 4-point scale for S-anxiety is as follows: 1.) not at all, 2.) somewhat, 3.) moderately so, 4.) very much so. The 4-point scale for T-anxiety is as follows: 1.) almost never, 2.) sometimes, 3.) often, 4.) almost always.

== Uses ==
The various State-Trait tests each evaluate different emotions. The State-Trait Anxiety Inventory measures anxiety by assessing someone’s state and trait anxiety. The STAI was one of the first tests to examine state and trait anxiety at the same time. There are two forms of the STAI, one for children, and for adults. The scale is useful for many different socio-economic backgrounds and groups and anyone that has the equivalence of a sixth grade reading level, it therefore can be utilized for many people. Clinicians use this in diagnosing patients in a clinical setting. It is also used to diagnose clinical anxiety in surgical and other medical patients as well as in mental health patients. The STAI, itself, assesses anxiety but also can be used to make a discrimination when wondering whether a patient is experiencing anxiety or depression. This inventory is used in research projects. Various journal articles have used the STAI in conducting research and comparing different ethnic groups, age groups, etc. regarding anxiety.

== Additional scales ==
There is also a State Trait Anxiety Inventory for children, or the STAIC. The STAIC distinguishes between how prone a child is to anxious behavior and emotional anxiety. It is very similar to the STAI, and is based on the same concept as the adult measure. This measure is used for children between the ages of 9–12. It includes two sets of 20 questions, 20 questions for A-State anxiety and 20 questions for A-Trait anxiety, that is easily read, and if needed can be verbally read to younger children. Spielberger also developed a few other scales, the State-Trait Anger Scale, the State-Trait Personality Inventory, and the State-Trait Anger Expression Inventory.

=== State-Trait Anger Scale (STAS) ===
Anger is an emotional state when feelings can vary in intensity, from irritation, to annoyance, to the extremes of fury or rage. This differs from hostility and aggression in that anger is much less complex than hostility or aggression, while both of these states can include feelings of anger.

The STAS is very similar in format to the STAI. However, this scale was formed instead to measure anger as an emotional state and how prone to anger people are.

This scale measures both state and trait anger, it is similar to the STAI in assessing state and trait emotions. State anger (S-Anger) is a psychobiological state or condition. This state consists of varying intensities of anger. It is assumed that S-Anger would change over time, based on the situations of the person. Trait anger (T-Anger) is defined by the individual differences in how often that S-Anger was experienced over time.

=== State-Trait Anger Expression Inventory (STAXI) ===
The STAXI provides objective and shortly scored measures of a person’s experience, expression, and control of anger. It consists of 44 items, which make up 7 scales. These scales measures six components of anger:

1. S-Anger: 10 questions
2. T-Anger: 10 questions
3. AX/In: 8 questions; This measures individual differences in how often feelings of anger are experienced and are held in and not acted on.
4. AX/Out: 8 questions; This measures individual differences in how often feelings of anger are acted upon towards people or objects.
5. AX/Con: 8 questions; This measures individual differences in how often a person tries to control their outward expression of anger.
6. AX/Ex: 24 questions; This provides a general view of how often anger is being experienced and expressed.

=== Six-item State-Trait Anxiety Inventory (STAI-6) ===
There is a short-form version of the state scale, consisting of six items chosen for reliability and validity. It is designed to be administered in circumstances that prohibit the use of the full-form, and produces scores that are comparable to using the full version.
