= Charles Spielberger =

American clinical community psychologist

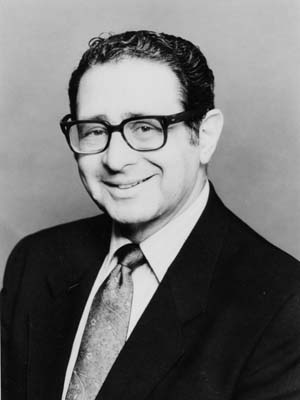

Charles Donald Spielberger (March 28, 1927 – June 11, 2013) was an American clinical community psychologist well-known for his development of the State-Trait Anxiety Inventory.

In 1972, as incoming president of the Southeastern Psychological Association he appointed the organization's Task Force on the Status of Women, chaired by Ellen Kimmel.

Spielberger was founding Editor (1973–76) of the American Journal of Community Psychology, official journal of Division 27 (Community Psychology) of the American Psychological Association. He was President of that Division in 1974-75. He won the Division's 1982 Award for Distinguished Contributions to Theory and Research in Community Psychology. He was president of the APA in 1991.

Spielberger was formerly Chairman of the Psychology Department at the University of South Florida in Tampa, Florida and in 2012 belonged to a think tank there.

In 1987 Spielberger was one of the key psychologists who supported the efforts of David Pilon and Scott Mesh in their efforts to form a national graduate student association. Spielberger was very supportive and helpful in this effort along with Raymond D. Fowler, then APA President, Virginia Staudt Sexton (St. John's University), Ellin Bloch (Division of Psychotherapy), and Pierre Ritchie (Canadian Psychological Association). In 1988 those efforts were successful and the American Psychological Association of Graduate Students was formed and in thriving 25 years later with over 30,000 members.

== State-Trait Anxiety Inventory ==
Spielberger, like Raymond Cattell and others before him, made the conceptual distinction between chronic or trait anxiety (a general propensity to be anxious) and temporary or state anxiety (a temporary state varying in intensity). To measure these concepts, he developed the State-Trait Anxiety Inventory.

=== Additional work on anxiety ===
His work on the measurement of anxiety has been famously cited by Rollo May. He also co-wrote the book Anxiety in Sports: An International Perspective One of his earlier books, co-authored with Eric Gaudry at the University of Melbourne, examined anxiety in relation to educational achievement.

== State Trait Anger Scale ==
Carrying this concept further, Spielberger distinguished between state and trait anger. State anger is defined as a temporary emotional state while trait anger is a general tendency to react angrily to perceive situations. (Spielberger et al., 1983). Spielberger became a well-known authority on anger and its manifestations.

== Early career ==
One of his first vocations was as an electronics technician in the U.S. Army (1945–1946). His post secondary education includes a B.S. in chemistry from the Georgia Institute of Technology (1949) and a B.A., M.A., and Ph.D. in Psychology from the University of Iowa.
