= Edward Hays =

Edward Hays is the name of:

- Edward D. Hays (1872–1941), U.S. Representative from Missouri
- Edward R. Hays (1847–1896), U.S. Representative from Iowa

== See also ==
- Edward Hayes (disambiguation)
- Edward Hay (disambiguation)
