= Edward Hayes =

Edward Hayes may refer to:

- Edward C. Hayes (1868–1928), American sociologist
- Edward A. Hayes (1893–1955), National Commander of the American Legion, 1933–34
- Tubby Hayes (Edward Brian Hayes, 1935–1973), British jazz musician
- Ned Hayes (1875–1945), Irish hurler

== See also ==
- Eddie Hayes (disambiguation)
- Edward Hays (disambiguation)
- Edward Hay (disambiguation)
