= Angyal =

Angyal is a Hungarian surname meaning "angel". Notable people with the surname include:

- Ákos Angyal, Hungarian sprint canoeist
- Anna Angyal (1848–1874), Hungarian novelist
- Andras Angyal (1902–1960), Hungarian-American psychiatrist
- Éva Angyal (born 1955), Hungarian handball player
- Zoltán Angyal, Hungarian sprint canoeist

== See also ==
- Ördögi angyal
