= Katharine Cook Briggs =

American writer (1875–1968)

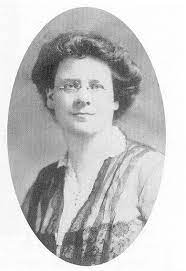
- Briggs in the early 20th century
- Born: Katharine Cook; January 3, 1875
- Died: July 10, 1968 (aged 93); Swarthmore, Pennsylvania, U.S.
- Known for: Myers–Briggs Type Indicator
- Spouse: Lyman James Briggs
- Children: 2, including Isabel
- Parent(s): Albert John Cook; Mary Harris Baldwin

Katharine Cook Briggs (January 3, 1875 – July 10, 1968) was an American writer who was the co-creator, with her daughter Isabel Briggs Myers, of an inventory of the popular yet pseudoscientific personality type system known as the Myers–Briggs Type Indicator (MBTI).

== Early life ==
=== Family life ===
Katharine Cook Briggs was born on January 3, 1875, in Ingham County, Michigan. Her father Albert John Cook was on the faculty of Michigan State University, previously known as Michigan Agricultural College. Her mother, née Mary Harris Baldwin, attended Oberlin College. After Katharine graduated from college she married Lyman James Briggs, a physicist and Director of the Bureau of Standards in Washington, D.C. On October 18, 1897, Katharine gave birth to Isabel Briggs Myers, the couple's only child who would survive infancy.

=== Education ===
Briggs was home schooled by her father. She never attended a formal school until she left for college at the age of fourteen. Briggs earned a college degree in agriculture and became an academic. She worked as a teacher after college.

== Early research ==
Briggs looked at data from studies of contemporary children's educational and social developmental theories. She created a vocation test for children as she saw this as a key to a child's future happiness and well being. Her earliest research led her to identify four main personality types in 1917: meditative types, spontaneous types, executive types, and sociable types, which later developed into the MBTI terms Ixxx (meditative), ExxP (spontaneous) ExTJ (executive), and ExFJ (social). However, while investigating the works of various philosophers, scientists and psychologists, she was unable to identify one definitive theory of type that encompassed all aspects. From the lack of findings, she decided to begin to distinguish her own theory of type.

=== Writings ===
She wrote essays about child-rearing and education, believing that children have an innate curiosity and that education is what fuels this natural instinct. Briggs' early interest in personality types developed from her attempts at fiction writing. To create richer characters for her fiction writing, she attempted to understand the details of human personality and behaviors. Briggs' first two articles were published in the journal New Republic. The first was published in 1926 ("Meet Yourself Using the Personality Paint Box") and the second in 1928 ("Up From Barbarism").

=== Isabel's involvement ===
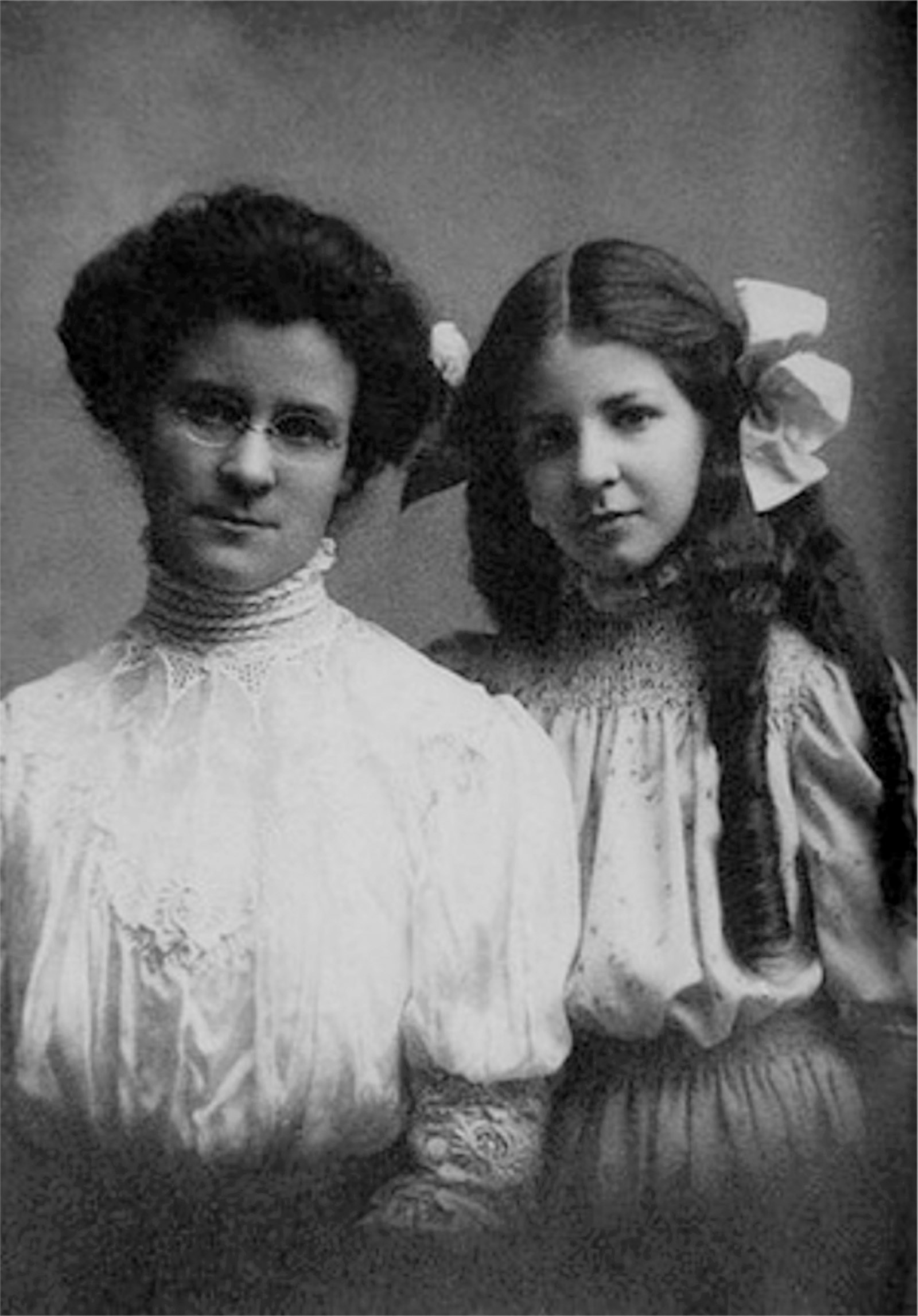
Cook (left) with her daughter Isabel in an early 20th century photograph

In 1923, Briggs read the work of Carl Jung and introduced it to her daughter. His theory focused on innate differences between people in regard to their decision making and their intake of information. She was inspired to write erotic fiction about Jung. After reading C.G. Jung's Psychological Types, Briggs abandoned her own creation of a personality theory and began to focus on Jung's ideas in a more in depth manner. Isabel, initially uninterested in type research, had a change of heart when she encountered work that attempted to identify people's appropriate type of work for their character. She decided to join efforts with her mother. Katharine and Isabel were greatly influenced by Jung. From here they began a twenty-year period of type watching. In 1945, Katharine and Isabel, with the help of Lyman Briggs, ran the first assessment on George Washington Medical School students. Keeping in mind her mother's early work, during World War II, Isabel created a test that would help identify a person's appropriate war-related job. Katharine typed herself as an INFJ (Advocate) using the test she and her daughter made.

=== Myers–Briggs Type Indicator ===
The rest of Briggs' life was devoted to bringing the ideas of Jung forward. Isabel took over the studies and with hers, her mother's and Jung's observations, was able to initiate the creation of a pencil and paper questionnaire to assess type. Briggs was primarily the driving force and inspiration behind the creation of the Myers–Briggs Type Indicator (MBTI) and Isabel was the work force that created the physical test itself.

Briggs and her early personality type research were instrumental in creating the MBTI. It is used in areas as broad as executive development and marital counseling. Since it was formally added to the Educational Testing Service's collection of tests in 1962, it is estimated that 50 million people have taken the MBTI. The MBTI classifies personality types along four pairs of categories. Katharine and Isabel claimed that everyone fits into one of the 16 possible combinations of personality type, with a dominant preference in each of the four pairs. The framework of the test has barely changed since Briggs first developed it. The MBTI is often criticized as pseudoscience by some who claim that Briggs developed the assessment in her home before doing any extensive scientific research, instead of the other way around.
