= Roger Birkman =

American psychologist (1919 - 2014)

- Born: February 1, 1919; Mercedes, Texas
- Died: March 26, 2014 (aged 95); Houston, Texas
- Education: University of Texas at Austin
- Occupation: Psychologist
- Known for: psychology and social perception in the workplace

Roger Winfred Birkman (February 1, 1919 – March 26, 2014) was an American organizational psychologist. He was the creator of The Birkman Method, a workplace psychological assessment. Birkman received his Ph.D. in psychology in 1961 from the University of Texas at Austin. He was the founder and chairman of the board of Birkman International, Inc.

== Career ==
Roger Birkman began his studies in psychology at the University of Houston before enlisting in the United States Army Air Corps and becoming a B-17 bomber pilot. He became interested in the exploration of individual psychological differences while serving during World War II. His experiences with the impact that perceptions, and misperceptions, among his crew and fellow pilots had on performance led him to the study of social psychology. He began developing The Birkman Method in the late 1940s while working with a group of scientists at the University of Houston surveying psychological instruments for pilot selection by the Air Force.

Birkman sought to create a single instrument that would measure self-concepts, social expectations, stress behaviors, and occupational interests valuable to both work and life. By 1951, he had completed his first iteration called the "Test of Social Comprehension." A self-report questionnaire eliciting responses about perception of self, social context, and occupational opportunities. Scales were empirically developed by comparing self-report item results with descriptions of likes, dislikes and behaviors provided by third parties. The Birkman Method took its final form in his 1961 doctoral dissertation. His work aligns with the social psychology theories of the organizational psychologist Kurt Lewin.

Birkman authored two books: True Colors (1995) and A Man of Understanding (2002). He was certified as a Licensed Psychologist in the State of Texas and was a member of the American Psychological Association, the Southwestern Psychological Association, Society for Industrial & Organizational Psychology, and the Texas Psychological Association.

He died in his sleep on March 26, 2014, at the age of 95.

== The Birkman Method ==
The Birkman Method is an online personality, social perception, and occupational interest assessment consisting of ten scales describing occupational preferences (Interests), 11 scales describing “effective behaviors” (Usual behaviors) and 11 scales describing interpersonal and environmental expectations (Needs or Expectations). A corresponding set of 11 scale values was derived to describe "less than effective" behaviors (Stress behaviors). Occupational profiling consists of 22 job families with more than 200 corresponding job titles all connected to O*Net.

The construction and comparative analysis of the Birkman Method is designed to provide insight into what specifically drives a person's behavior, with the goal of creating greater choice and more self-responsibility. It attempts to measure social behaviors, underlying expectations of interpersonal and task actions, potential stress reactions to unmet expectations, occupational preferences and organizational strengths. It is empirically supported by reliability and validity studies, including studies using classical test theory (CTT) and item response theory (IRT). The Birkman Method has 3 different types of assessments available.

== See also ==
- Barnum effect
- Donald O. Clifton
- Myers–Briggs Type Indicator
- Type theory

== Further reading and viewing ==
- Birkman Fink, Sharon & Capparell, Stephanie. (2013). The Birkman Method: Your Personality at Work. John Wiley & Sons. ISBN 978-1-118-20701-7 (cloth); ISBN 978-1-118-41937-3 (ebk)
- Birkman, R. (1995). True Colors. Thomas Nelson Inc. ISBN 0-7852-7856-7.
- Birkman, R. (2002). A Man of Understanding. Houston 2002. ASIN B0018E5AJS.
- Birkman, R., Elizondo, F., Lee, L. G., Wadlington, P. W., Zamzow, M. (2008). The Birkman Method Manual. Birkman International Inc. ISBN 978-0-9817099-0-1.
- Charles, Connie. The Magic of The Method: How the Birkman Profile Can Be Your Power Source for Success.
- Schweiger, D. (2002). M&A Integration : A Framework for Executives and Managers. McGraw-Hill. ISBN 978-0-07-138303-5.
- Wadlington, E. A., & Wadlington, P. L. (2011). Teacher Dispositions: Implications for Teacher Education. Childhood Education.

== Notes ==
- Arlene Nisson Lassin, "Personality test pioneer set standard for companies", Houston Chronicle, Nov. 19, 2009
- Gloria Alvarez, "Motivation Man; World War II pilot lands method to help employer-employee relations", Houston Chronicle, 20 Nov. 2003. Gale Document Number: GALE|A110759407
- Robert Kendall, "True Colors" (book review), Hispanic Times. May/Jun1995, Vol. 16 Issue 3, p35. Quote: "Dr. Roger Birkman, who developed the highly acclaimed Birkman Method of personality assessment more than 40 years ago"
- Louise A. Ferrebee, "When a red loves a yellow" (book review), Marriage Partnership. Summer95, Vol. 12 Issue 2, p59.
