= Eddie Hayes =

Eddie Hayes may refer to:

- Eddie Hayes (lawyer), Edward Hayes, (born c. 1947/48), American lawyer, journalist, and memoirist
- Eddie Hayes (rapper) (Edwin Hayes), American rap singer Aceyalone

== See also ==
- Edward Hayes (disambiguation)
