= Jungian Type Index =

Psychological classification metric

The Jungian Type Index (JTI) is an alternative to the Myers–Briggs Type Indicator (MBTI). Introduced by Optimas in 2001, the JTI was developed over a 10-year period in Norway by psychologists Thor Ødegård and Hallvard E: Ringstad. The JTI was designed to help capture individuals' preferred usage of the psychological functions identified by Carl Jung in his book Psychological Types, such as thinking vs feeling and sensing vs intuition.

The JTI's questions and methodology for identifying the preferred functions differs from the MBTI. For example, it eliminates word pairs, which can be troublesome to translate from English into other languages. In many languages, the sentence context frames the meaning of a word, while in English the words themselves may denote more meaning.

== Overview ==
Similar to the MBTI, the JTI identifies four categories from which the 16 types are formed: Extraversion/Introversion, Intuiting/Sensing, Thinking/Feeling, Perceiving/Judging. A personality type is reached through an examination or introspection about these categories. For example, an Intuiting, Thinking, Judging Extravert would be classified as an ENTJ. However, further complexity lies below this surface-level classification. Each personality type has its associated Jungian cognitive functions, which aim to further explain the ways in which people with each type perceive and interact with reality. Each type has all four of the cognitive functions (Thinking, Feeling, Intuiting, and Sensing) arranged in a different order and with different levels of introversion/extraversion. Of the two middle letters of any type, one will be the primary function with which they interact with the world, and one will be the auxiliary. For example, an ENTJ's primary function is (extraverted) Thinking, and their secondary function is (introverted) Intuiting.

== Commercialization ==
Though it is relatively unknown in the United States, it has some market share in Scandinavia although the original MBTI tool is still the most commonly used. In Norway and Sweden, the JTI is also gaining users in conjunction with other tools that complement the JTI for career development and coaching. It also has distributors in the Netherlands, China, and Germany.

== Debate about type dynamics ==
Some MBTI practitioners argue that the application of type dynamics (e.g. with inferred types like "Extraverted Sensing") to MBTI is a logical category error that has little empirical evidence backing it. Instead, they argue the best evidence for Myers Briggs types comes when the types are viewed as separate categories that function independent from one another as dichotomous types.

== See also ==
- Analytical psychology – Jungian theories
- Keirsey Temperament Sorter – Personality questionnaire
- Minnesota Multiphasic Personality Inventory – Standardized psychometric measure of psychopathology and personality
- Personality test – Method of assessing human personality constructs
- Socionics – Pseudoscientific personality theory
