= Elazar Rokeach of Amsterdam =

Rabbi Elazar Rokeach אלעזר רוקח

Personal life
- Born: c. 1665 Kraków
- Died: 1742 Safed
- Parent: Samuel (father)

Religious life
- Religion: Judaism

Rabbi Elazar Rokeach (Hebrew: אלעזר רוקח) also known as Eleazar ben Samuel (c. 1685—1742), was the author of Maaseh Rokeach, and Chief Rabbi of Amsterdam.

He was born at Kraków about 1685; died at Safed, Israel, 1742. According to family legends, he was a direct paternal descendant of Eleazar of Worms. On the completion of his studies he became dayyan of Kraków. In 1708 he accepted the rabbinate of Rakow, Poland. From there he went to Brody, where he became rabbi (1714). In 1735 he went to Amsterdam in response to a call from the Ashkenazic congregation there. A medal was designed in his honor, one side of which exhibited his head in relief, surrounded by the words: "Eleazar ben Samuel, Rabbi of Brody" (in Hebrew), the other side containing chosen verses from the Psalms. Elazar was one of those who placed Moses Ḥayyim Luzzatto under excommunication.

In 1740 Elazar decided to go to Eretz Israel. He took up his residence at Safed, where his life, however, was not of a peaceful character. It came to his knowledge that many of the most respected citizens of the place were reading the works of Nehemiah Ḥayyun and of other adherents of Shabbethai Ẓebi. Elazar vigorously endeavored to eradicate this tendency, but his efforts were in vain. His life thus became embittered, and he was seriously contemplating a return to Europe, when death intervened. Elazar, besides being a great Talmudist, was a profound kabalist and an able darshan.

His published works are: "Arba' Ṭure Eben" (Four Rows of Stone), containing responsa and novellæ on Maimonides' "Yad" and on the Talmud (Lemberg, 1789); "Maaseh Rokeach" (Work of the Ointment-Maker), a cabalistic commentary on the Mishnah (Amsterdam, 1740); "Maaseh Rokeach," on the Pentateuch (Lemberg, 1789).

His grandson was Rabbi Elazar Rokeach (II), father of Rabbi Sholom Rokeach of Belz.

In various times up to the present, many people bearing the surname "Rokeach" or "Rokach" - including famous later rabbis, Israeli politicians and others prominent in different fields - are considered to be among his descendants.
