= Myers–Briggs Type Indicator =

Pseudoscientific personality questionnaire

A chart with descriptions of each Myers–Briggs psychological type and the four dichotomies central to the Jungian theory

The Myers–Briggs Type Indicator (MBTI) is a self-report questionnaire that makes pseudoscientific claims (Note: Attributed to multiple sources:) to categorize individuals into 16 distinct psychological types (often called personality types). The test assigns a binary letter value to each of four dichotomous categories: introversion or extraversion, sensing or intuition, thinking or feeling, and judging or perceiving. This produces a four-letter test result, such as "INTJ" or "ESFP", representing one of the 16 types.

The original version of the MBTI was constructed during World War II by Americans Katharine Cook Briggs and her daughter Isabel Briggs Myers, inspired by Swiss psychiatrist Carl Jung's 1921 book Psychological Types. Isabel Myers was particularly fascinated by the concept of "introversion", and she typed herself as an INFP. However, she thought that the book was too complex for the general public and tried to organize the Jungian cognitive functions to make it more accessible.

As a psychometric indicator, the test exhibits significant deficiencies, including poor validity, poor reliability, measuring supposedly dichotomous categories that are not independent, and not being comprehensive. Most of the research supporting the MBTI's validity has been produced by the Center for Applications of Psychological Type, an organization run by the Myers–Briggs Foundation, and published in the center's own journal, the Journal of Psychological Type (JPT), raising questions of independence, bias and conflict of interest. Nevertheless, due to the Barnum effect, participants often attribute a level of accuracy to the results that is disproportionate to their scientific credibility.

The MBTI is not considered useful in psychological practice or study, since it lacks predictive power. According to University of Pennsylvania professor Adam Grant, "There is no evidence behind it. The traits measured by the test have almost no predictive power when it comes to how happy you'll be in a given situation, how well you'll perform at your job, or how satisfied you'll be in your marriage." Despite controversies over validity, the instrument has demonstrated widespread influence since its adoption by the Educational Testing Service in 1962. It is estimated that 50 million people have taken the MBTI and that 10,000 businesses, 2,500 colleges and universities, and 200 government agencies in the United States use it.

== History ==
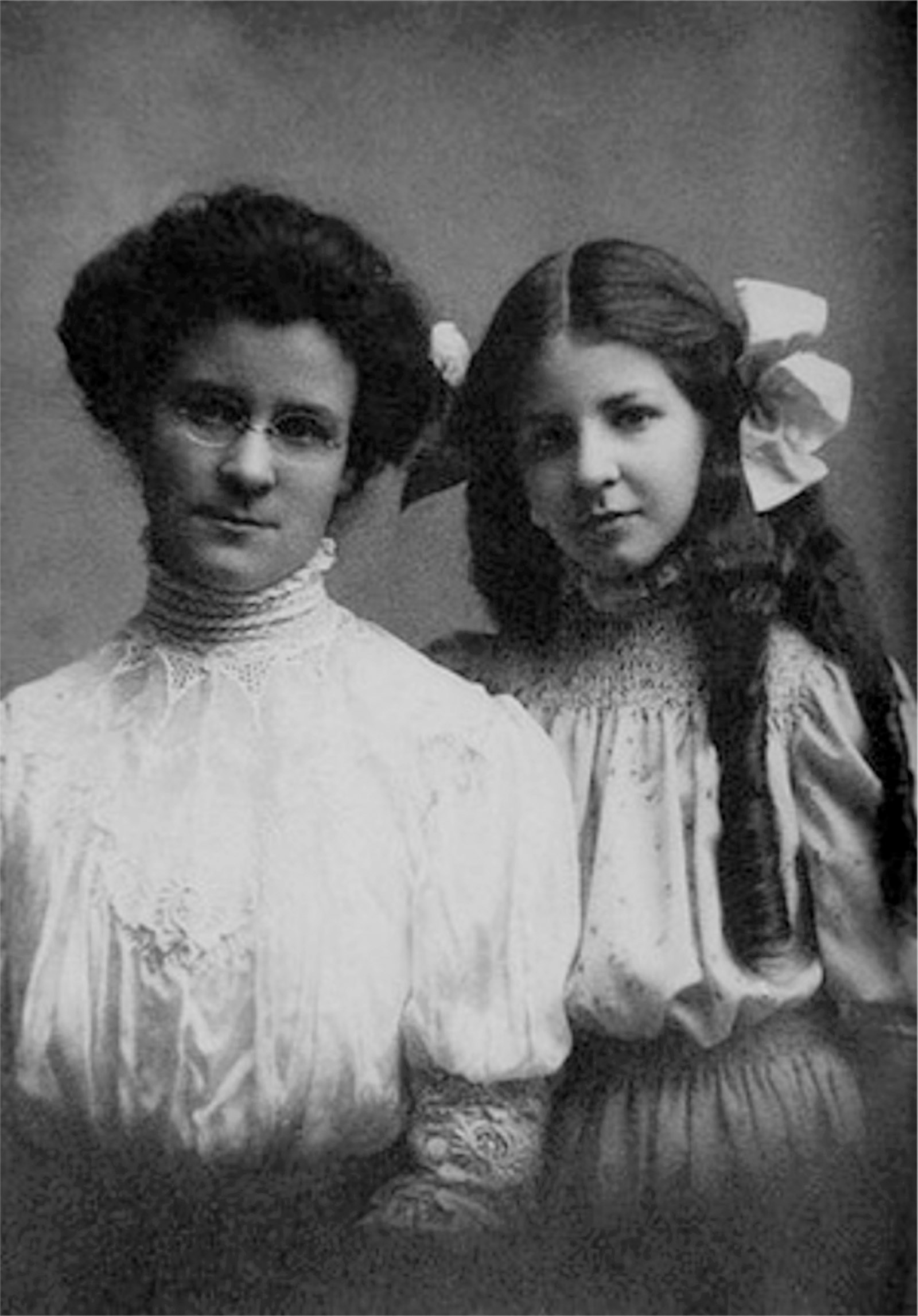
Katharine Cook Briggs and Isabel Briggs Myers extrapolated their MBTI theory from Carl Jung's writings in his 1921 book Psychological Types

Briggs began her research into personality in 1917. Upon meeting her future son-in-law, she observed marked differences between his personality and that of other family members. Briggs embarked on a project of reading biographies and subsequently developed a typology wherein she proposed four temperaments: meditative (or thoughtful), spontaneous, executive, and social.

After the publication in 1923 of an English translation of Carl Jung's book Psychological Types (first published in German as Psychologische Typen in 1921), Briggs recognized that Jung's theory resembled, but went far beyond, her own. Briggs's four types were later identified as corresponding to the IXXXs (Introversion: "meditative"), EXXPs (Extraversion & Perceiving: "spontaneous"), EXTJs (Extraversion, Thinking & Judging: "executive") and EXFJs (Extraversion, Feeling & Judging: "social"). (Note: "X" stands for dichotomies: in this particular case, what letter goes in which place doesn't matter for the description. (e.g., EXXPs may be (1) ENFPs, (2) ESFPs, (3) ENTPs, or (4) ESTPs.)) Her first publications were two articles describing Jung's theory, in The New Republic, "Meet Yourself Using the Personality Paint Box" (1926) and "Up From Barbarism" (1928). After extensively studying the work of Jung, Briggs and her daughter extended their interest in human behavior into efforts to turn the theory of psychological types to practical use.

Although Myers graduated from Swarthmore College in political science in 1919, neither Myers nor Briggs were formally educated in the discipline of psychology, and both were self-taught in the field of psychometric testing. Myers therefore apprenticed herself to Edward N. Hay (1891–1958), the head personnel officer for a large Philadelphia bank. From Hay, Myers learned rudimentary test construction, scoring, validation, and statistical methods.

Briggs and Myers began creating their indicator during World War II (1939–1945) in the belief that a knowledge of personality preferences would help women entering the industrial workforce for the first time to identify the sorts of war-time jobs that would be the "most comfortable and effective" for them. The Briggs Myers Type Indicator Handbook, published in 1944, was re-published as "Myers–Briggs Type Indicator" in 1956.

Myers' work attracted the attention of Henry Chauncey, head of the Educational Testing Service, a private assessment organization. Under these auspices, the first MBTI "manual" was published, in 1962. The MBTI received further support from Donald W. MacKinnon, head of the Institute of Personality and Social Research at the University of California, Berkeley; W. Harold Grant, a professor at Michigan State University and Auburn University; and Mary H. McCaulley of the University of Florida. The publication of the MBTI was transferred to Consulting Psychologists Press in 1975, and the Center for Applications of Psychological Type was founded as a research laboratory.

After Myers' death in May 1980, Mary McCaulley updated the MBTI manual, and the second edition was published in 1985. The third edition appeared in 1998.

=== Format and administration ===
In 1987, an advanced scoring-system was developed for the MBTI. From this was developed the Type Differentiation Indicator (TDI), which is a scoring system for the longer MBTI, Form J, which includes the 290 items written by Myers that had survived her previous item analyses. It yields 20 subscales (five under each of the four dichotomous preference scales), plus seven additional subscales for a new "comfort-discomfort" factor (which parallels, though not perfectly measuring, the NEO-PI factor of neuroticism). This factor's scales indicate a sense of overall comfort and confidence versus discomfort and anxiety. They also load onto one of the four type-dimensions:

- guarded-optimistic (T/F),
- defiant-compliant (T/F),
- carefree-worried (T/F),
- decisive-ambivalent (J/P),
- intrepid-inhibited (E/I),
- leader-follower (E/I), and
- proactive-distractible (J/P).

Also included is a composite of these called "strain". There are also scales for type-scale consistency and comfort-scale consistency. Reliability of 23 of the 27 TDI subscales is greater than 0.50, "an acceptable result given the brevity of the subscales".

In 1989, a scoring system was developed for only the 20 subscales for the original four dichotomies. This was initially known as "Form K" or "the Expanded Analysis Report". This tool is now called the MBTI Step II.

Form J or the TDI included the items (derived from Myers' and McCaulley's earlier work) necessary to score what became known as Step III. (The 1998 MBTI Manual reported that the two instruments were one and the same) Step III was developed in a joint project involving the following organizations: the Myers–Briggs Company, the publisher of all the MBTI works; the Center for Applications of Psychological Type (CAPT), which holds all of Myers' and McCaulley's original work; and the MBTI Trust headed by Katharine and Peter Myers. CAPT advertised Step III as addressing type development and the use of "perception and judgment" by respondents.

== Concepts ==
The MBTI is based on the theory of psychological types proposed by Swiss psychiatrist Carl Jung in 1921, which was partially based on the four elements of classical cosmology. Jung speculated that people experience the world using four principal psychological functions—sensation, intuition, feeling, and thinking—and that one of these four functions is dominant in an individual, a majority of the time. In MBTI theory, the four categories are introversion/extraversion, sensing/intuition, thinking/feeling, and judging/perceiving. According to the MBTI, each person is said to have one preferred quality from each category, producing 16 unique types.

The MBTI Manual states that the indicator "is designed to implement a theory; therefore, the theory must be understood to understand the MBTI". Fundamental to the MBTI is the hypothesis of psychological types as originally developed by Carl Jung. Jung proposed the existence of two dichotomous pairs of cognitive functions:

- The "rational" (judging) functions: thinking and feeling.
- The "irrational" (perceiving) functions: sensation and intuition.

Jung believed that for every person, each of the functions is expressed primarily in either an introverted or extraverted form. Based on Jung's original concepts, Briggs and Myers developed their own theory of psychological type, described below, on which the MBTI is based. According to psychologist Hans Eysenck writing in 1995, the 16 personality types used in the MBTI are incomplete as Jung's theory used 32 types, 16 of which could not be measured by a questionnaire. Both Jung's original model and the simplified MBTI remain hypothetical, with no controlled scientific studies supporting either.

=== Differences from Jung ===
Jung did not see the type preferences (such as introversion and extraversion) as dualistic, but rather as tendencies: both are innate and have the potential to balance.

Jung's typology theories postulated a sequence of four cognitive functions (thinking, feeling, sensation, and intuition), each having one of two polar tendencies (extraversion or introversion), giving a total of eight dominant functions (Te, Extraverted Thinking; Ti, Introverted Thinking; Fe, Extraverted Feeling; Fi, Introverted Feeling; Se, Extraverted Sensing; Si, Introverted Sensing; Ne, Extraverted Intuition; Ni, Introverted Intuition). The MBTI is based on these eight hypothetical functions. While the Jungian model proposes the first three dichotomies, Myers and Briggs added the judging (J) and perceiving (P) preferences. According to Myers and Briggs, J and P indicate a person's most preferred extraverted function, which is the dominant function for extraverted types and the auxiliary function for introverted types.

=== Type dynamics and development ===
A diagram depicting the cognitive functions of each type: A type's background color represents its dominant function and its text color represents its auxiliary function.

The MBTI sorts some psychological differences into four sets of opposite pairs, or "dichotomies", with a resulting 16 possible psychological types. None of these is considered to be "better" or "worse"; however, Briggs and Myers theorized that people innately "prefer" one overall combination of type differences.

The 16 types are typically referred to by an abbreviation of four letters – the initial letters of each of their four type preferences (except in the case of intuition, which uses the abbreviation "N" to distinguish it from introversion). For instance:

- ENTJ: extraversion (E), intuition (N), thinking (T), judgment (J)
- ISFP: introversion (I), sensing (S), feeling (F), perception (P)

These abbreviations are applied to all 16 types.

The interaction of two, three, or four preferences is known as "type dynamics". Type dynamics has received little or no empirical support to substantiate its viability as a scientific theory. Myers and Briggs asserted that for each of the 16 four-preference types, one function is the most dominant and is likely to be evident earliest in life. A secondary or auxiliary function typically becomes more evident (differentiated) during teenage years and provides balance to the dominant. In normal development, individuals tend to become more fluent with a third, tertiary function during mid-life, while the fourth, inferior function remains least consciously developed. The inferior function is purportedly associated with the unconscious, and is most evident in situations such as high stress (sometimes referred to as being "in the grip" of the inferior function).

The use of type dynamics is disputed: in the conclusion of various studies on the subject of type dynamics, psychologist James H. Reynierse writes, "Type dynamics has persistent logical problems and is fundamentally based on a series of category mistakes; it provides, at best, a limited and incomplete account of type related phenomena"; and "type dynamics relies on anecdotal evidence, fails most efficacy tests, and does not fit the empirical facts". His studies gave the clear result that the descriptions and workings of type dynamics do not fit the real behavior of people. He suggests getting completely rid of type dynamics, because it does not help, but hinders understanding of personality. The presumed order of functions 1 to 4 did only occur in one out of 540 test results.

=== Four dichotomies ===
Carl Jung
	Subjective	Objective
Perception	Intuition/Sensing	Introversion/Extraversion 1
Judging	Feeling/Thinking	Introversion/Extraversion 2

Myers–Briggs, 16 Personalities
		Subjective	Objective
Deduction	Deduction, Induction	Intuition/Sensing	Introversion/Extraversion
Deduction	Deduction, Induction	Intuition/Observing	Introversion/Extraversion
Induction	Retroduction	Feeling/Thinking	Perception/Judging
Induction	Retroduction	Feeling/Thinking	Prospecting/Judging

The four pairs of preferences or "dichotomies" proposed by Briggs and Myers are shown in the adjacent table.

The terms as used in the MBTI may differ from their everyday usage. For example, people who prefer judgment over perception are not necessarily more "judgmental" or less "perceptive", nor does the MBTI instrument attempt to measure aptitude; instead, it attempts to indicate personal preference. Myers considered the direction of the preference (for example, E vs. I) to be more important than the degree of the preference (for example, very clear vs. slight).

=== Attitudes: extraversion/introversion ===
Myers–Briggs literature uses the terms extraversion and introversion as Jung first used them. Extraversion means literally outward-turning and introversion, inward-turning. These specific definitions differ somewhat from the popular usage of the words. Extraversion is the spelling used in MBTI publications.

=== Functions: sensing/intuition and thinking/feeling ===
Jung identified two pairs of psychological functions:

- Two perceiving functions: sensation (usually called sensing in MBTI writings) and intuition
- Two judging functions: thinking and feeling

According to Jung's typology model, each person uses one of these four functions more dominantly and proficiently than the other three; however, all four functions are used at different times depending on the circumstances. Each of these proposed function can manifest in either an extraverted or an introverted attitude, so Jung's model includes eight combinations of functions and attitudes, four of which are largely conscious and four unconscious. John Beebe created a model that combines ideas of archetypes and the dialogical self with functions, each function viewed as performing the role of an archetype within an internal dialog.

According to Briggs and Myers, people who prefer sensing are more likely to trust information that is in the present, tangible, and concrete. They tend to distrust hunches. Those who prefer intuition tend to trust information that is associated with other information, either remembered or discovered from context.

Thinking and feeling are described as the decision-making (judging) functions by Briggs and Myers. These functions are used to make rational decisions, based on the data received from their information-gathering functions. Those who prefer thinking tend to decide things from a more detached standpoint. Those who prefer feeling tend to come to decisions by associating or empathizing with the situation.

People who prefer thinking do not necessarily, in the everyday sense, "think better" than their feeling counterparts, as the MBTI attempts to measure of preference, not ability or skill. Similarly, those who prefer feeling do not necessarily have "better" emotional reactions than their thinking counterparts.

==== Dominant function ====
According to Jung, people use all four cognitive functions. However, one function is generally used in a more conscious and confident way. This dominant function is supported by the secondary (auxiliary) function, and to a lesser degree the tertiary function. The fourth and least conscious function is always the opposite of the dominant function. Myers called this inferior function the "shadow."

The four functions operate in conjunction with the attitudes (extraversion and introversion). Each function is used in either an extraverted or introverted way.

=== Lifestyle preferences: judging/perception ===
Myers and Briggs added a dimension to Jung's typological model, claiming that people have a preference for using either the judging function (thinking or feeling) or their perceiving function (sensing or intuition) when relating to the outside world (extraversion). According to Myers, judging types like to "have matters settled", while perceptive types prefer to "keep decisions open".

== Accuracy and validity ==
... a major task in interpretation is to help respondents with less clear reported preferences arrive at a comfortable and accurate assessment of their type. This is accomplished in an interpretation session mainly through an exploration of how type preferences appear in client behaviors.

— The MBTI Manual, Chapter 6: Interpreting Results of the MBTI and Verifying Type

Despite its popularity, the MBTI has been widely regarded as pseudoscience by the scientific community. The validity (statistical validity and test validity) of the MBTI as a psychometric instrument has been the subject of much criticism. Media reports have called the test "pretty much meaningless", and "one of the worst personality tests in existence". The psychologist Adam Grant is especially vocal against the MBTI, having called it "the fad that won't die" in a Psychology Today article in 2013. Psychometric specialist Robert Hogan wrote: "Most personality psychologists regard the MBTI as little more than an elaborate Chinese fortune cookie." Nicholas Campion comments that this is "a fascinating example of 'disguised astrology', masquerading as science in order to claim respectability."

It has been estimated that between a third and a half of the published material on the MBTI has been produced for the special conferences of the Center for the Application of Psychological Type (which provide the training in the MBTI, and are funded by sales of the MBTI) or as papers in the Journal of Psychological Type (which is edited and supported by Myers–Briggs advocates and by sales of the indicator). It has been argued that this reflects a lack of critical scrutiny. Many of the studies that endorse the MBTI are methodologically weak or unscientific. A 1996 review by Gardner and Martinko concluded: "It is clear that efforts to detect simplistic linkages between type preferences and managerial effectiveness have been disappointing. Indeed, given the mixed quality of research and the inconsistent findings, no definitive conclusion regarding these relationships can be drawn."

Susan Krauss Whitbourne, professor emerita of the University of Massachusetts Amherst, likens the test to horoscopes, as both rely on the Barnum effect, leading participants to personally identify with descriptions that are somewhat desirable, vague, and widely applicable. The MBTI is not recommended in counseling.

=== Little evidence for dichotomies ===
As previously stated in the Myers–Briggs Type Indicator § Four dichotomies section, Isabel Myers considered the direction of the preference (for example, E vs. I) to be more important than its degree. This would mean that scores on each MBTI scale would show a bimodal distribution with most people scoring near the ends of the scales, thus dividing people into either, e.g., an extraverted or an introverted psychological type. However, most studies have found that scores on the individual scales were actually distributed in a centrally peaked manner, similar to a normal distribution, indicating that the majority of people were actually in the middle of the scale and were thus neither clearly introverted nor extraverted. But in order for the MBTI to be scored, a cut-off line is used at the middle of each scale and all those scoring below the line are classified as a low type and those scoring above the line are given the opposite type. Thus, psychometric assessment research fails to support the concept of type, but rather shows that most people lie near the middle of a continuous curve.

Although we do not conclude that the absence of bimodality necessarily proves that the MBTI developers' theory-based assumption of categorical "types" of personality is invalid, the absence of empirical bimodality in IRT-based research of MBTI scores does indeed remove a potentially powerful line of evidence that was previously available to "type" advocates to cite in defense of their position.

=== Little evidence for "dynamic" type stack ===
Some MBTI supporters argue that the application of type dynamics to the MBTI (e.g., where inferred "dominant" or "auxiliary" functions like Se / "Extraverted Sensing" or Ni / "Introverted Intuition" are presumed to exist) is a logical category error that has little empirical evidence backing it. Instead, they argue that Myers–Briggs validity as a psychometric tool is highest when each type of category is viewed independently as a dichotomy.

=== Validity and utility ===
The content of the MBTI scales is problematic. In 1991, a National Academy of Sciences committee reviewed data from MBTI research studies and concluded that only the I-E scale has high correlations with comparable scales of other instruments and low correlations with instruments designed to assess different concepts, showing strong validity. In contrast, the S-N and T-F scales show relatively weak validity. The 1991 review committee concluded at the time there was "not sufficient, well-designed research to justify the use of the MBTI in career counseling programs". This study based its measurement of validity on "criterion-related validity (i.e. does the MBTI predict specific outcomes related to interpersonal relations or career success/job performance?)." The committee stressed the discrepancy between popularity of the MBTI and research results stating, "the popularity of this instrument in the absence of proven scientific worth is troublesome." There is insufficient evidence to make claims about utility, particularly of the four letter type derived from a person's responses to the MBTI items.

=== Lack of objectivity ===
The accuracy of the MBTI depends on honest self-reporting. Unlike some personality questionnaires, such as the 16PF Questionnaire, the Minnesota Multiphasic Personality Inventory, or the Personality Assessment Inventory, the MBTI does not use validity scales to assess exaggerated or socially desirable responses. As a result, individuals motivated to do so can fake their responses. One 2000 study in the journal Pastoral Psychology found a weak but statistically significant correlation between the MBTI judging scale and the Eysenck Personality Questionnaire lie scale, suggesting that more socially conformant individuals according to that questionnaire are more likely to be considered judging according to the MBTI.

=== Terminology ===
The terminology of the MBTI has been criticized as being very "vague and general", so as to allow any kind of behavior to fit any personality type, which may result in the Barnum effect, where people give a high rating to a positive description that supposedly applies specifically to them. Others argue that while the MBTI type descriptions are brief, they are also distinctive and precise. Some authors, such as David Keirsey, have created their own systems that claim to provide more detail. For instance, Keirsey's descriptions of his four temperaments, which he correlated with the 16 MBTI personality types, claims to show how the temperaments differ in terms of language use, intellectual orientation, educational and vocational interests, social orientation, self-image, personal values, social roles, and characteristic hand gestures.

=== Factor analysis ===
Researchers have reported that the JP and the SN scales correlate with one another. One factor-analytic study based on (N=1291) college-aged students found six different factors instead of the four purported dimensions, thereby raising doubts as to the construct validity of the MBTI.

=== Reliability ===
The test-retest reliability of the MBTI tends to be low. Large numbers of people (between 39% and 76% of respondents) obtain different type classifications when retaking the indicator after only five weeks. In a 2013 Fortune Magazine article titled "Have we all been duped by the Myers-Briggs Test?", Roman Krznaric wrote:

The interesting – and somewhat alarming – fact about the MBTI is that, despite its popularity, it has been subject to sustained criticism by professional psychologists for over three decades. One problem is that it displays what statisticians call low "test-retest reliability." So if you retake the test after only a five-week gap, there's around a 50% chance that you will fall into a different personality category compared to the first time you took the test.
A second criticism is that the MBTI mistakenly assumes that personality falls into mutually exclusive categories. ... The consequence is that the scores of two people labelled "introverted" and "extraverted" may be almost exactly the same, but they could be placed into different categories since they fall on either side of an imaginary dividing line.

Within each dichotomy scale, as measured on Form G, about 83% of categorizations remain the same when people are retested within nine months and around 75% when retested after nine months. About 50% of people re-administered the MBTI within nine months remain the same overall type and 36% the same type after more than nine months. For Form M (the most current form of the MBTI instrument), the MBTI Manual reports that these scores are higher.

In one study, when people were asked to compare their preferred type to that assigned by the MBTI assessment, only half of people chose the same profile.

Robert and Mary Capraro in 2002 meta-analysis published in the journal Educational and Psychological Measurement found out that "In general, the MBTI and its scales yielded scores with strong internal consistency and test-retest reliability estimates, although variation was observed." The analysis found that of 210 studies from 1998 to 2001, 14 (7%) reported directly on the reliability of the data, 26% reported reliability via prior studies or the test manual, and 56% did not mention reliability at all.

It has been argued that criticisms regarding the MBTI mostly come down to questions regarding the validity of its origins, not questions regarding the validity of the MBTI's usefulness. Others argue that the MBTI can be a reliable measurement of personality, and "like all measures, the MBTI yields scores that are dependent on sample characteristics and testing conditions".

== Statistics ==
A 1973 study of university students in the United States found the INFP type was the most common type among students studying the fine arts and art education subjects, with 36% of fine arts students and 26% of art education students being INFPs. A 1973 study of the personality types of teachers in the United States found Intuitive-Perceptive types (ENFP, INFP, ENTP, INTP) were over-represented in teachers of subjects such as English, social studies and art, as opposed to science and mathematics, which featured more sensing (S) and judging (J) types. A questionnaire of 27,787 high school students suggested INFP students among them showed a significant preference for art, English, and music subjects.

== Utility ==
Isabel Myers claimed that the proportion of different personality types varied by choice of career or course of study. However, researchers examining the proportions of each type within varying professions report that the proportion of MBTI types within each occupation is close to that within a random sample of the population. Some researchers have expressed reservations about the relevance of type to job satisfaction, as well as concerns about the potential misuse of the instrument in labeling people.

The Myers–Briggs Company, then known as Consulting Psychologists Press (and later CPP), became the exclusive publisher of the MBTI in 1975. They call it "the world's most widely used personality assessment", with as many as two million assessments administered annually. The Myers-Briggs Company and other proponents state that the indicator meets or exceeds the reliability of other psychological instruments.

The MBTI has poor predictive validity of employees' job performance ratings. As noted above under Precepts and ethics, the MBTI measures preferences, not ability. The use of the MBTI as a predictor of job success is expressly discouraged in the Manual. It is argued that the MBTI only continues to be popular because many people are qualified to administer it, it is not difficult to understand, and there are many supporting books, websites and other sources which are readily available to the general public.

== Correlations with other instruments ==
=== Big Five ===
McCrae and Costa (1989) present correlations between the MBTI scales and the Big Five personality constructs measured. The five purported personality constructs have been labeled: extraversion, openness, agreeableness, conscientiousness, and neuroticism (emotional instability). The following correlations are based on the results from 267 men and 201 women as part of a longitudinal study of aging.

	Extraversion	Openness	Agreeableness	Conscientiousness	Neuroticism
E–I	−0.74	0.03	−0.03	0.08	0.16
S–N	0.10	0.72	0.04	−0.15	−0.06
T–F	0.19	0.02	0.44	−0.15	0.06
J–P	0.15	0.30	−0.06	−0.49	0.11

The closer the number is to 1.0 or −1.0, the higher the degree of correlation.

These correlations refer to the second letter shown, i.e., the table shows that I and P have negative correlations with extraversion and conscientiousness, respectively, while F and N have positive correlations with agreeableness and openness, respectively. McCrae and Costa conclude that, "correlational analyses showed that the four MBTI indices did measure aspects of four of the five major dimensions of normal personality. The five-factor model provides an alternative basis for interpreting MBTI findings within a broader, more commonly shared conceptual framework." However, "there was no support for the view that the MBTI measures truly dichotomous preferences or qualitatively distinct types, instead, the instrument measures four relatively independent dimensions."

== Popularity ==
=== South Korea ===
At the time of the COVID-19 pandemic, MBTI testing became a fad among young South Koreans who were using it in an attempt to find compatible dating partners. The fad originated with a website called 16Personalities.com, which offers a free approximation of the official paid test. Both independent experts and a representative of the MBTI publishing company have cautioned against using the MBTI test for dating, as the test was not designed for this purpose. South Korea experienced a similar trend in the early 2000s with the blood type personality theory.

One survey reported that by December 2021, nearly half of the population had taken the MBTI personality test. The MBTI personality test also became an issue in 2022 presidential election. In March 2022, Korea JoongAng Daily reported that "A growing number of Korean companies are asking job candidates to reveal their MBTI personality test results, angering job hunters who argue that the test is an unreasonable standard to screen and evaluate their capabilities." A survey of South Korean job-seekers in their twenties found that 60% opposed the use of the test for such purposes.

=== China ===
16Personalities.com also influenced an MBTI fad in China, where some employers and job recruiters have asked applicants about their MBTI or 16Personalities results. The trend in China also led to MBTI-related products, paid services, and social media such as podcasts and memes.

=== Misuse ===
In 2021, director Tim Travers Hawkins's film Persona: The Dark Truth Behind Personality Tests premiered on HBO. The company which owns the test condemns its misuse, writing the test "is not, and was never intended to be predictive, and should never be used for hiring, screening or to dictate life decisions".

== See also ==
- Adjective Check List (ACL)
- Brain types
- Riso–Hudson Enneagram Type Indicator
- Jungian Type Index
- Revised NEO Personality Inventory
- Minnesota Multiphasic Personality Inventory
- Thomas Kilmann Conflict Mode Instrument
- Two-factor models of personality § Factors integrated into modern instruments (CPI 260)
