= University of Virginia Japanese Text Initiative =

The University of Virginia Japanese Text Initiative (JTI) is a project intended to provide a comprehensive online database of Japanese literary texts. Sponsored by the University of Virginia and the University of Pittsburgh East Asian Library, the online collection contains over 300 texts from Japan's pre-modern and modern periods (generally defined as before and after the Meiji Restoration of 1868). Pre-modern texts include the Man'yōshū, the Tale of Genji, the Kokin Wakashū, and the Hōjōki. Modern texts include works by Natsume Sōseki, Mori Ōgai, and Akutagawa Ryūnosuke.

The stated aim of the initiative is "In the short term... to put online most or all of the Twenty Classical Works in J. Thomas Rimer's A Reader's Guide to Japanese Literature, revised edition (New York: Kodansha, 1999)". The aim is also to add pre-20th century literature and as much 20th century literature as copyright restrictions will allow.

The database is still a work in progress, and it is not completely comprehensive; generally, the later in time one goes, the fewer works are featured. There are relatively few Edo-period pieces, and some Meiji and Taishō period authors are either absent, or not all of their works are available. As of October 2014, the last update was in March 2004.

The database can be browsed either by author or by title, and includes a search function which, among other things, can be used to search for specific or phrases occurring in the works available.
