= Anna Angyal =

Hungarian author

- Born: Anna Engel; 1848; Veszprim, Kingdom of Hungary
- Died: 1874 (aged 25–26); Austria-Hungary
- Writing career
- Language: Hungarian

Anna Angyal (née Engel; 1848–1874) was a Hungarian-Jewish author. She also served as a governess.

== Biography ==
Born in Veszprim in 1848, she attended the Jewish community school of her birthplace, and later that in the town of Hódmezővásárhely, where her father was a teacher. Versed in Hungarian, French, and German literature, Angyal began her literary career at the age of sixteen. Her first novella, Egy magyar család kalandjai ('Adventures of a Hungarian Family'), was published in the Hungarian magazine Szegedi Hiradó. In 1865 she published in the Magyar Izsráelita a short novel entitled Előítéletek ('Prejudices'), in which she described the condition of the Jews in Hungary. Her historical novel, Ilonka és Elemér, was published in 1868.

After the completion of this novel, she accepted a position as governess in Pest, where she wrote several poems and an autobiography. She died after succumbing to an illness in the autumn of 1874.
