= Rokeach =

Rokeach or Rokach (Hebrew for "apothecary", "perfume", "perfumer" or "pharmacist") is the surname of:

- Aharon Rokeach (1877–1957), the fourth Belzer rebbe
- Elazar Rokeach (c. 1176 – 1238), Talmudist and kabbalist
- Elazar Rokeach of Amsterdam, (c. 1665–1742), rabbi
- Israel Rokach (1886–1959), Israeli politician
- Joel Rokach (1909–1965), Italian–Israeli physicist and mathematician
- Lucy Rokach, English professional poker player
- Malka Rokeach, the first Belzer rebbetzin
- Milton Rokeach (1918–1988), Professor of social psychology
- Sholom Rokeach (1779–1855), the first Belzer rebbe
- Yehoshua Rokeach (1825–1894), the second Belzer rebbe
- Yehoshua Rokeach of Machnovka (born 1949), current Machnovka Rebbe
- Yissachar Dov Rokeach (born 1948), the fifth Belzer rebbe
- Yissachar Dov Rokeach (1854–1926), the third Belzer rebbe

Rokach may also refer to:

- Rokach (river), a river in Bucha Raion, Kyiv Oblast, Ukraine
