= Isabel Briggs Myers =

American writer (1897–1980)

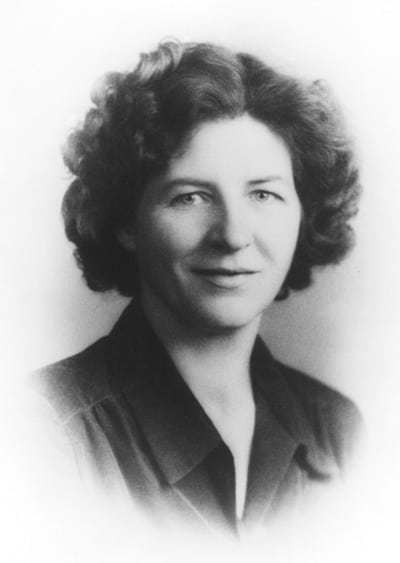
- Myers in the early 20th century
- Born: Isabel Briggs; October 18, 1897
- Died: May 5, 1980 (aged 82)
- Education: Swarthmore College (BA)
- Known for: Myers–Briggs Type Indicator
- Spouse: Clarence Myers
- Children: 2
- Parent(s): Lyman James Briggs; Katharine Cook

Isabel Briggs Myers (born Isabel Briggs; October 18, 1897 – May 5, 1980) was an American writer who co-created the personality test known as the Myers–Briggs Type Indicator (MBTI) with her mother, Katharine Cook Briggs. The MBTI is one of the most-often used personality tests worldwide; over two million people complete the questionnaire each year. Isabel Briggs Myers typed herself as an INFP (Mediator).

== Background ==
Isabel Briggs Myers grew up in Washington, D.C. where she was home-schooled by her mother, Katharine Cook Briggs. Her father, Lyman James Briggs, worked as a research physicist. Briggs had little formal schooling up until she attended Swarthmore College, where she studied political science. During her time at the college she met Clarence "Chief" Gates Myers who was studying law. The two married in 1918 and were together until his death in 1980. When Briggs Myers died in 1980 she left the copyright to the MBTI (which was little known at the time) to her son Peter.

== Fiction ==
In August 1928, she participated in a mystery novel writing contest jointly offered by McClure's magazine and Frederick A. Stokes Company. Her novel Murder Yet to Come won the contest and was published periodically in the monthly magazine The Smart Set (which had absorbed McClure's in March 1929) between August 1929 and January 1930. It was later published in book form by Frederick A. Stokes Company on January 2, 1930.

The contest prize included a $7,500 (equivalent to $141,000 in 2025) cash award and a contract for a second work of fiction. Briggs Myers fulfilled her obligation by writing the novel Give Me Death, which revisits the same detectives from Murder Yet to Come. In it, a Southern family commits suicide one by one after learning they may have "Negro blood". The novel was published in 1934 and received harsh treatment from critics.

== MBTI personality indicator ==
As WWII broke out, Briggs Myers read an article titled "Fitting the Worker to the Job" and she recognized a need for a "people sorting instrument", especially as US involvement in the war in Europe seemed more likely. She wrote her epiphany in a letter to her mother, who was a staunch Carl Jung enthusiast. Briggs Myers implemented the ideas of Carl Jung and added her own insights. She then created a paper survey which would eventually become the MBTI. The test was to assess personality type and was fully developed after 20 years of research by Briggs Myers with her mother. The three original pairs of preferences in Jung's typology are Extraversion and Introversion, Sensation and Intuition, and Thinking and Feeling. After studying them, Briggs Myers added a fourth pair, Judging and Perceiving. Isabel Briggs Myers typed herself as an INFP (Mediator) personality and was an explorer of the concept of introversion and extraversion.

In the July 1980 edition of MBTI News, Briggs Myers attributed another reason for creating the MBTI to her marriage to Clarence Myers. Their differences in perceived psychological types inspired her mother, Katharine Cook Briggs, to keep studying differences among people and their actions. Her mother had come upon the work of Carl Gustav Jung and introduced it to her daughter who then started studying the psychological types.

In 1945, the dean of the George Washington School of Medicine allowed Briggs Myers and her mother to apply the MBTI to first-year undergraduates. This included about 5,500 students and Briggs Myers studied it for years by looking at patterns among dropouts and successful students.

In 1975, Briggs Myers co-founded the Center for Application of Psychological Type with Mary McCaulley. CAPT is a non-profit organization run by the Myers & Briggs Foundation, which maintains research and application of the MBTI, also existing to protect and promote Briggs Myers' ideology. Its headquarters are in Gainesville, Florida, and its motto is "Fostering human understanding through training, publishing, and research".

As of 2022, according to the Myers & Briggs Foundation, "research on the MBTI instrument has continued into the present, with dozens of articles published each year." The Isabel Briggs Myers Memorial Research Awards exist to further MBTI and psychological research. These awards are given twice a year, consisting of $2,000 for up to two people. Most of the research supporting the MBTI's validity has been produced by CAPT and published in the center's own journal, the Journal of Psychological Type, raising questions of independence, bias, and conflict of interest.

As of 2022, although the MBTI is widely used by businesses, coaches and psychologists, the MBTI has been found to have significant validity issues, and is not widely endorsed by academic researchers in psychology.

== Publications ==
- Myers, I. (1980, 1995) Gifts Differing: Understanding Personality Type. Davies-Black Publishing, U.S. ISBN 0-89106-074-X
  - Gifts Differing is written by Isabel with her son, Peter Briggs Myers. It is about human personality and how it affects several aspects of life such as career, marriage, and meaning of life. It speaks about all sixteen personality types.
- Myers, I. (1990) Introduction to Type: A Description of the Theory and Applications of the Myers-Briggs Type Indicator. Center for Applications of Psychological Type Inc. ISBN 0-935652-06-X
- Myers, I. and McCaulley, M. (1985) Manual: A Guide to the Development and Use of the Myers-Briggs Type Indicator. Consulting Psychologists Press. ISBN 0-89106-027-8
