= First Pennsylvania Bank =

First Pennsylvania Bank was a bank based in Philadelphia, Pennsylvania. Founded in 1782 as the Bank of North America and taking the First Pennsylvania name in a 1955 merger, it was for centuries the oldest bank in the United States until it was acquired by CoreStates Financial Corporation in 1989.

In the 1970s, First Pennsylvania officials attempted to turn their firm, then a "sedate regional bank", into a major national concern. Aggressive and risky lending and investments turned the bank into Philadelphia's largest, but in 1980, led to huge losses and panicked depositors. The federal government gave the bank a $500 million bailout, the first major federal bailout of a national bank.

== See also ==
- List of bank mergers in the United States
