= Adjective Check List =

Psychological assessment using 300 adjectives for common traits

- Purpose: assess psychological traits of an individual

The Adjective Check List (ACL) is a psychological assessment containing 300 adjectives used to identify common psychological traits. The ACL was constructed by Harrison G. Gough and Alfred B. Heilbrun, Jr. with the goal to assess psychological traits of an individual. The ACL measures 37 scales within 5 categories: modus operandi (4 scales), need (15 scales), topical (9 scales), transactional analysis (5 scales), and origence-intellectence (4 scales). To complete the ACL, respondents select the adjectives that they believe describe themselves (or someone else). Any number of items may be selected from the list of adjectives. In this way, the results are customized to include only those adjectives salient to the individual being assessed. The ACL takes between 10–15 minutes to complete and may be administered to individuals, groups, or used by researchers to describe study participants. The ACL is protected by copyright law, published by Consulting Psychologists Press, and distributed by Mind Garden, Inc.

The ACL was first developed in the early days of the Institute of Personality Assessment and Research at the University of California, Berkeley. It has been used since 1952 by many psychologists worldwide and is one of the 100 most frequently used and cited tests in psychology.

== ACL research and uses ==
"The ACL offers several advantages. It is self-administering, may be completed in 10 to 15 minutes, arouses little resistance or anxiety, and has proved useful in studies of highly effective persons in occupations other than politics such as architecture, mathematics, law, medicine, and management.

"Further, as a multidimensional instrument, which taps several domains of personality, the ACL affords an appraisal of positive as well as negative factors in human behavior, thus avoiding the frequently found preoccupation with psychopathological bases of political activity. Additionally, as an established standardized, and quantitative assessment procedure, the ACL reduces the problems of reliability and comparability entailed in studies relying on interviews or on ad hoc, limited use or abbreviated personality measures” (Constantini & Craik, 1980, p. 645).

"We propose that the Gough-Heilbrun Adjective Check List is another broad-range instrument with considerable promise as a general cross-cultural research tool. The argument is based on: the nature of the task, which seems appropriate in many cultural settings; the versatility of the method in addressing a variety of research questions; the fact that the instrument has been translated into many different languages; and the successful use of the method in recent cross-cultural studies" (Williams & Best, 1983, p. 164).

== ACL success factors at work ==
The ACL scales were realigned in 2012 by Rob Devine in consultation with Gough to highlight how collections of characteristics, skills, and competencies impact success at work. This realignment, called success factors at work, uses 30 of the original 37 ACL scales and assigns each to one of six work success factors which have proven to be central and important to success at work. The six work success factors are:

- Managing self
- Thinking and deciding
- Getting things done
- Managing work
- Working with people
- Leading people

== ACL scales ==
The ACL consists of 37 scales within 5 categories: modus operandi (4 scales), need (15 scales), topical (9 scales), transactional analysis (5 scales), and origence-intellectence (4 scales).

=== Modus operandi scales ===
The modus operandi scales assess ways in which the individual approached the task of describing themselves (or someone else).

- Number checked: Total number of adjectives checked.
- Favorable: The number of favorable (socially desirable) adjectives checked.
- Unfavorable: The number of unfavorable (socially undesirable) adjectives checked.
- Communality: Correspondence of responses to the pattern of checking typically found among people-in-general.

=== Need scales ===
The need scales assess an individual's psychological needs or wants. These were identified as important in Henry A. Murray's Need-Press theory of personality.

- Achievement: To strive to be outstanding in pursuits of socially recognized significance.
- Dominance: To seek and maintain a role as leader in groups, or to be influential and controlling in individual relationships.
- Endurance: To persist in any task undertaken.
- Order: To place special emphasis on neatness, organization, and planning in one's activities.
- Intraception: To engage in attempts to understand one's own behavior or the behavior of others.
- Nurturance: To engage in behaviors that provide material or emotional benefits to others.
- Affiliation: To seek and maintain numerous personal friendships.
- Heterosexuality: To seek the company of and derive emotional satisfaction from interactions with peers of the opposite sex.
- Exhibition: To behave in such a way as to elicit the immediate attention of others.
- Autonomy: To act independently of others or of social values and expectations.
- Aggression: To engage in behaviors that attack or hurt others.
- Change: To seek novelty of experience and avoid routine.
- Succorance: To solicit sympathy, affection, or emotional support from others.
- Abasement: To express feelings of inferiority through self-criticism, guilt, or social impotence.
- Deference: To seek and maintain subordinate roles in relationships with others.

=== Topical scales ===
The topical scales assess a diverse set of attributes, potentialities, and role characteristics.

- Counseling readiness: Readiness to accept counseling or professional advice in regard to personal problems, psychological difficulties, and the like.
- Self-control: The extent to which self-control is imposed, and valued.
- Self-confidence: Self-confidence, poise, and self-assurance.
- Personal adjustment: Good adjustment in the sense of the ability to cope with situational and interpersonal demands and a feeling of efficacy.
- Ideal self: Strong sense of personal worth; or, harmony between what one is and what one wants to be.
- Creative personality: The desire to do and think differently from the norm, and a talent for originality.
- Military leader: Steadiness, self-discipline, good judgment of the kind required in positions of military (or related) leadership.
- Masculinity: Role-qualities such as ambition, assertiveness, and initiative associated with everyday notions of masculinity.
- Femininity: Role-qualities such as helpfulness, sympathy, and affection associated with everyday notions of femininity.

=== Transactional analysis scales ===
The transactional analysis scales - an egogram - assess components of ego functioning. These were identified as important by Eric Berne's transactional analysis theory of personality.

- Critical parent: Attitudes of evaluation, severity, and skepticism associated with the concept of a "critical parent."
- Nurturing parent: Attitudes of support, stability, and acceptance associated with the concept of a "nurturing parent."
- Adult: Attitudes of independence, objectivity, and industriousness associated with the concept of a "mature adult."
- Free child: Attitudes of playfulness, impulsivity, self-centeredness associated with the concept of a "free" or very expressive child.
- Adapted child: Attitudes of deference, conformity, and self-discipline associated with the concept of an "adapted" or very dutiful child.

=== Origence-intellectence scales ===
The origence-intellectence scales assess the balance between preferences for affective-emotional and rational-realistic models of functioning. These were identified as important by George S. Welsh's creativity and intelligence research.

- High origence - low intellectence: Feelings and emotion (high origence) valued more highly than detachment and rationality (low intellectence). High scores suggest informality, vitality, and playfulness.
- High origence - high Intellectence: High value placed on both affect (origence) and rationality (intellectence). High scores suggest versatility, unconventionality, and individuality.
- Low origence - low Intellectence: No particular value placed on either origence or intellectence. High scores suggest contentment, conventionality, and optimism.
- Low origence - high intellectence: Rationality and analysis (intellectence) valued more highly than feelings and emotion (origence). High scores suggest logicality, industriousness, and cognitive clarity.
