= Psychological Types =

1921 book by Carl Gustav Jung

- Cover
- Author: Carl Jung
- Original title: Psychologische Typen
- Translator: H. Godwyn Baynes
- Language: German
- Series: The Collected Works of C. G. Jung
- Publisher: Zurich: Rascher Verlag
- Publication date: 1921
- English publication date: 1923
- ISBN: 0-691-01813-8 (1971 ed.)
- Website: hdl:2027/uc1.b4377042

Psychological Types (German: Psychologische Typen) is a book by Carl Jung that was originally published in German by Rascher Verlag in 1921, and translated into English in 1923, becoming volume 6 of The Collected Works of C. G. Jung. It is the baseline of many personality typology systems, particularly Myers Briggs.

In the book, Jung proposes four main functions of consciousness: two perceiving or non-rational functions (Sensation and Intuition), and two judging or rational functions (Thinking and Feeling). These functions are modified by two main attitude types: extraversion and introversion.

Jung proposes that the dominant function, along with the dominant attitude, characterizes consciousness, while its opposite is repressed and characterizes the unconscious. Based on this, the eight principal psychological types are:

- Extraverted Sensation, and Introverted Sensation;
- Extraverted Intuition, and Introverted Intuition;
- Extraverted Thinking, and Introverted Thinking;
- Extraverted Feeling, and Introverted Feeling.

Jung describes in detail the effects of tensions between the complexes associated with the dominant and inferior differentiating functions in highly and even extremely one-sided types.

== Historical context ==
Jung's interest in typology grew from his desire to reconcile the theories of Sigmund Freud and Alfred Adler, and to define how his own perspective differed from theirs. Jung wrote, "In attempting to answer this question, I came across the problem of types; for it is one's psychological type which from the outset determines and limits a person's judgment." He concluded that Freud's theory was extraverted and Adler's introverted. Jung became convinced that acrimony between the Adlerian and Freudian camps was due to this unrecognized existence of different fundamental psychological attitudes, which led Jung "to conceive the two controversial theories of neurosis as manifestations of a type-antagonism."

The characteristic animosity between the adherents of the two standpoints arises from the fact that either standpoint necessarily involves a devaluation and disparagement of the other. So long as the radical difference between [Adler's] ego-psychology and [Freud's] psychology of instinct is not recognized, either side must naturally hold its respective theory to be universally valid.

Due to the multifarious nature of fantasy, the fantasies of both Adlerian and Freudian patients contained ample empirical evidence to reinforce the steadfast belief of each side in their respective theories.

The scientific tendency in both is to reduce everything to their own principle, from which their deductions in turn proceed. In the case of fantasies this operation is particularly easy to accomplish because...they...express purely instinctive as well as pure ego-tendencies. Anyone who adopts the standpoint of instinct will have no difficulty in discovering in them the "wish-fulfillment," the "infantile wish," the "repressed sexuality." And the man who adopts the standpoint of the ego can just as easily discover those elementary aims concerned with the security and differentiation of the ego, since fantasies are mediating products between the ego and the instincts. Accordingly they contain elements of both sides. Interpretation from either side is always somewhat forced and arbitrary, because one side is always suppressed.

Each side can demonstrate the truth embodied in its theory. However, it is only partial truth and not generally valid because it excludes the principle and truth embodied in the other.

Nevertheless, a demonstrable truth does on the whole emerge; but it is only a partial truth that can lay no claim to general validity. Its validity extends only so far as the range of its principle. But in the domain of the other principle it is invalid.

Jung still used Adler's and Freud's theories, but in restricted circumstances.

This [type-antagonism] discovery brought with it the need to rise above the opposition and to create a theory which would do justice not merely to one or the other side, but to both equally. For this purpose a critique of both the aforementioned theories is essential. Both are painfully inclined to reduce high-flown ideals, heroic attitudes, nobility of feeling, deep convictions, to some banal reality, if applied to such things as these. On no account should they be so applied...In the hand of a good doctor, of one who really knows the human soul...both theories, when applied to the really sick part of a soul, are wholesome caustics, of great help in dosages measured to the individual case, but harmful and dangerous in the hand that knows not how to measure and weigh.

The two theories of neurosis are not universal theories: They are caustic remedies to be applied, as it were, locally.

Naturally, a doctor must be familiar with the so-called "methods." But he must guard against falling into any specific, routine approach. In general one must guard against theoretical assumptions... In my analyses they play no part. I am unsystematic very much by intention. We need a different language for every patient. In one analysis I can be heard talking the Adlerian dialect, in another the Freudian.

== Contents ==
=== Chapter I ===
In this opening chapter, Jung traces the history of typology back to Gnosticism and early Christian theology. He suggests that the psychological differences between Platonism and Aristotelianism, as well as the theological disputes between early church fathers, were driven by type differences. Specifically, he contrasts Tertullian (whom he characterizes as an introverted thinker who sacrificed his intellect to feeling) with Origen (an extravert who sacrificed his sensuality to the spirit). Jung further analyzes the controversy over transubstantiation, proposing that the divergent views on whether the Eucharist was a symbolic or literal transformation arose from the fundamental psychological differences between introverted and extraverted attitudes toward the object. (Note: Extensive detailed abstracts of each chapter are available online.)

=== Chapter II ===
Jung devotes this chapter to Friedrich Schiller's Letters on the Aesthetic Education of Man. He analyzes Schiller's division of poets into the "naïve" (one who is one with nature, corresponding to extraversion) and the "sentimental" (one who reflects on nature, corresponding to introversion). Jung credits Schiller with recognizing the tension between the instincts of feeling and thinking (or the "sensuous" and the "formal" drives) and praises Schiller’s concept of the "play drive" as a transcendent function that unites the opposites through the creation of symbols.

=== Chapter III ===
Here, Jung examines Friedrich Nietzsche's The Birth of Tragedy (1872). He aligns the Apollonian impulse—associated with dream, measure, restraint, and the inner world of images—with introversion. Conversely, he aligns the Dionysian impulse—associated with intoxication, the breaking of boundaries, and the merging with the collective instinct—with extraversion. While acknowledging Nietzsche's insight, Jung critiques the philosopher for treating the extraverted release of the Dionysian as a purely aesthetic phenomenon rather than a psychological mechanism of release for the introvert.

=== Chapter IV ===
This chapter focuses on the work of the 19th-century British surgeon Furneaux Jordan. Jung discusses Jordan's classification of character into "the less impassioned, active" type (extravert) and "the more impassioned, reflective" type (introvert). Jung notes that Jordan’s observations were largely ignored because they contradicted the prevailing view that introversion was a form of pathology, whereas Jordan viewed the reflective nature as simply a different mode of functioning.

=== Chapter V ===
By far the longest chapter in the book, this section is a detailed psychological analysis of Carl Spitteler's epic poem Prometheus and Epimetheus. Jung interprets the two brothers as personifications of the conflicting mechanisms within the human psyche. Prometheus represents the introvert who sacrifices the present for the future and the object for the inner image (foresight), while Epimetheus represents the extravert who is orientated by the object and the demands of the moment (hindsight). Jung uses this analysis to explore the concept of the "soul-image" (later developed as the Anima and Animus), arguing that the repression of one function leads to its accumulation in the unconscious, eventually forcing a "enantiodromia," or conversion into the opposite.

=== Chapters VI–IX ===
In these intermediate chapters, Jung surveys how the type problem appears in psychiatry, aesthetics, philosophy, and biography:

- Chapter VI (Psychopathology): Jung reviews the work of Otto Gross, contrasting "deep" consciousness (introversion) with "shallow" or broad consciousness (extraversion).
- Chapter VII (Aesthetics): Jung analyzes Wilhelm Worringer's Abstraction and Empathy. He correlates "empathy" with the extraverted willingness to merge with the object, and "abstraction" with the introverted need to withdraw from the object due to an underlying fear of its overwhelming influence.
- Chapter VIII (Modern Philosophy): Jung discusses William James's distinction between "tender-minded" (rationalist, idealist) and "tough-minded" (empiricist, materialist) thinkers, equating them broadly with introversion and extraversion, respectively.
- Chapter IX (Biography): Jung briefly touches upon the subjectivity of biographers, noting that the psychological type of the biographer inevitably colors their interpretation of the subject's life.

=== Chapter X: "General Description of the Types" ===
==== Attitude-types ====
Consciousness is directed by a tendency to form objective (from the environment) or subjective (from the psyche) motives and ideas. Respectively, they are extraversion and introversion, giving rise to extraverts and introverts. The unconscious has its own attitude, opposite of consciousness.

==== Function-types ====
Psychological functions are a form of mental activity that remain the same in principle under different conditions and cannot be reduced to each other. They can be rational and judging (thinking/feeling) or irrational and perceiving (sensation/intuition).

Thinking is the function which, in accordance with its logical laws, uses concepts to connect information. Feeling is a function that, according to its subjective value, accepts or rejects a concept. Sensation is the function that transmits physiological stimulus to conscious perception. Intuition is the function that transmits invisible, mental associations.

Just as consciousness is directed by an attitude, it is also directed by a function, giving rise to thinking types, feeling types, sensation types, and intuitive types. Likewise, the unconscious opposes the function-type with an opposing function. A thinking type's unconscious is characterized by feeling, and a sensation type's unconscious by intuition. The functions of the other group are more or less susceptible to conscious influence, that being their differentiation. For a thinking type, those are intuition and sensation; for a sensation type, those are thinking and feeling. The unconscious functions exist in an archaic state, and are often present in dreams and fantasies.

==== Psychological types ====
There are eight total combinations of the attitude-type and the function-type; the psychological types. They are categorised as extraverted rational types, extraverted irrational types, introverted rational types, and introverted irrational types.

Extraverted rational types judge concepts and situations by what is generally considered to be rational. They suppress subjective reason and perception, and if repression occurs, they fall under their influence via the unconscious. Repressed sensation can express itself in the form of compulsive pleasure-seeking, and suppressed intuition in the form of compulsive suspicion of the unpleasant and evil. The extraverted feeling type dispenses judgement according to what is acceptable for and in tune with the environment. The extraverted thinking type judges according to the objective facts and valid ideas of the environment. Repressed subjective judging in an extraverted feeling type leads to a surfacing of undeveloped, negative ideas that deprecate what is valued, and an absolutist character for them. In an extraveted thinking type, selfish intentions surface, the person becomes overly sensitive and dogmatic, and loses sight of everything not relevant to the formula or cause.

Extraverted irrational types are guided simply by events as they happen, without constant judgement, and they base themselves on experiences. They suppress subjective perception and reason. If judging is repressed, they become calculating and the person never stays put long enough to reap the fruits of their work. Thinking takes the form of apparent sophistries or pedantry, and feeling of ruthlessness or puritanism. The extraverted sensation type is guided by experiences and is always on the lookout for new ones that excite the senses and are enjoyable. The extraverted intuitive type is guided by new ideas and possibilities in the making. Repressed subjective perception in an extraverted sensation type causes an unscrupulous search for stimulation, and unconscious intuition supplies wild suspicions, phobias, superstitions, and religious streaks. In an extraverted intuitive type, hypochondria and absurd bodily sensations surface, and compulsive attachments to certain sensations given by people.

Introverted rational types judge by their own principles. If objective judging is repressed, they become inflexible, navel-gazing, egotistical, and develop feelings of inferiority that they compensate for in the real world. The introverted thinking type is concerned with developing logical insights for its subjective ideas- an example is Kant. The introverted feeling type is also concerned with these ideas, but the person judges them with their feeling-values. Repressed objective judging in an introverted thinking type makes the person isolated, unsympathetic, sensitive to minor things that supposedly secretly concern the person, and aggressive in the face of criticism. In an introverted feeling type, the person becomes domineering, plotting, and forms many rivals.

Introverted irrational types are captivated by their subjective perception and inner world, chiefly as related to the collective unconscious. When objective perception is repressed, they become deluded and lose touch with reality. The introverted sensation type is guided by their perceptions that are merely suggested by the object in the moment, related to its aesthetic, becoming, and passing. This is seen when paintings of the same landscape differ not simply in ability. Intuition, on the other hand, receives from the sensation only the impetus to immediate activity; it peers behind the scenes, quickly perceiving the inner image that gave rise to the specific phenomenon, i.e. the attack of vertigo, in the present case. It sees the image of a tottering man pierced through the heart by an arrow. This image fascinates the intuitive activity; it is arrested by it, and seeks to explore every detail of it. It holds fast to the vision, observing with the liveliest interest how the picture changes, unfolds further, and finally fades. In this way introverted intuition perceives all the background processes of consciousness with almost the same distinctness as extraverted sensation senses outer objects. When objective perception is repressed in an introverted sensing type, compulsive thoughts of external malevolence occur. The introverted intuitive type becomes a hypochondriac, sensitive in the sense organs, and compulsively tied to particular people or objects.

==== Auxiliary functions ====
In reality, a type's principal function is often influenced by another function of secondary importance, despite its absolute sovereignty. Opposing functions, like thinking and feeling can be on the same level, but then they're relatively undeveloped. Sensation can give thinking practicality, intuition can give thinking speculations, feeling can give intuition feeling for choice of artistic images, thinking can give intuition a system for its vision, etc. The auxiliary can also allow the unconscious to be approached, by protecting the conscious standpoint from undue influence. A uniformly conscious state of functions is present among prehistoric peoples.

=== Chapter XI: Definitions ===
This concluding chapter functions as a glossary, providing in-depth definitions for over fifty key concepts used throughout the book and Jung's wider psychology. It serves to clarify the specific meanings Jung assigns to terms that are often used loosely in common language. Significant definitions include:

- Idea: An image that is derived from the collective unconscious rather than personal experience.
- Introversion/Extraversion: Defined strictly as the direction of libido (psychic energy) inward toward the subject or outward toward the object.
- Soul (Psyche): Distinguished from the "Soul-image" (Anima/Animus) and the Persona.
- Self: Defined as the center of the total personality (conscious and unconscious), distinct from the Ego, which is the center of the conscious mind only.
- Symbol: Described as the best possible expression for a complex fact not yet clearly grasped by consciousness, acting as a machine to transform energy.

== Neuropsychological and Empirical Validation of Jung's Typology ==
=== Experimental Origins and Word Association ===
Jung's typological model was fundamentally rooted in his early experimental research at the Burghölzli Psychiatric Hospital (1900–1909). Using the Word Association Test, Jung provided some of the first quantitative data on the unconscious. He observed that "complexes" (emotionally charged clusters of ideas) caused measurable delays in reaction times and physiological disturbances (skin conductance changes). Crucially, Jung identified that individuals exhibited consistent "attitudinal styles" in their responses: some were habitually oriented toward the objective stimulus (extraversion), while others were consistently diverted by internal, subjective associations (introversion).

=== The Biological Axis of Arousal and Dopamine ===
Modern neurobiology has validated Jung's "direction of libido" through the study of cortical arousal and neurotransmitter sensitivity. Ascending Reticular Activating System (ARAS): Building on the Eysenckian model, research confirms that introverts possess a higher baseline of cortical arousal. This physiological state makes them more sensitive to sensory input, leading to a centripetal withdrawal to avoid overstimulation—a direct parallel to Jung’s "subjective protection". Dopaminergic Reward System: Studies by Depue and Collins (1999) demonstrate that extraverts exhibit higher sensitivity in the mesolimbic dopamine system. Their brains show increased activation in the ventral striatum when processing external rewards, validating Jung's theory of the "centrifugal" flow of energy toward the object.

=== Regional Brain Mapping of Cognitive Functions ===
Advancements in fMRI and EEG have allowed for the mapping of Jung's four functions to specific neural architectures: Thinking (T) vs. Feeling (F): The "Rational" axis corresponds to the distinction between the dorsolateral prefrontal cortex (logic, executive control) and the ventromedial prefrontal cortex / amygdala (evaluation of social and emotional values). Research in neuroethics by Joshua Greene (2001) confirms that the brain utilizes these distinct "circuits" for impersonal logic versus value-based decision making.

=== Longitudinal Stability and Genetics ===
The "type" as a stable biological category is supported by the work of Jerome Kagan, whose longitudinal studies on infants showed that "high-reactive" temperaments (precursors to introversion) and "low-reactive" temperaments (precursors to extraversion) are visible as early as four months of age and remain stable through adulthood. Genetic studies have identified a heritability factor for these orientations ranging from 39% to 58%, suggesting that Jungian types are innate biological specializations rather than acquired behaviors.

== Conceptual and Physiological Divergence: Types vs. Traits ==
The distinction between Jungian Type Theory and modern Trait Theory (e.g., the Five-Factor Model or Big Five) is a subject of significant neuropsychological debate. While trait models categorize personality based on lexical frequency and social behavior, Jung’s typology focuses on the underlying cognitive architecture and the movement of psychic energy (libido).

=== Behavioral "Output" vs. Biological "Engine" ===
Critics of the Big Five, such as Jack Block, have argued that lexical models only describe the "surface" of personality—how an individual is perceived by others—without explaining the biological "why".

=== The Dopaminergic Fallacy in Trait Models ===
Neurobiological research by Richard Depue reveals a fundamental flaw in how trait models aggregate behaviors. Big Five "Extraversion" often blends sociability (the desire for affiliation) with agency (assertiveness and reward-seeking).

Physiologically, Jungian extraversion correlates with the mesolimbic dopamine system's sensitivity to external rewards. In contrast, sociability is governed by distinct opiatergic systems related to bonding. As a result, a Jungian extravert may be socially withdrawn (misanthropic) yet remains biologically extraverted due to a high dopaminergic response to non-social objective goals (e.g., intellectual or creative pursuits), a distinction that trait-based models fail to capture.

=== Neuroplasticity and the Stability of the "Core" Type ===
While trait models suggest that personality dimensions can shift significantly with age (the "maturity principle"), neurophysiological evidence from Jerome Kagan suggests that the underlying amygdala reactivity (the biological core of introversion-extraversion) remains remarkably stable throughout the lifespan. Individuals may acquire "extraverted" social behaviors (improving their Big Five score), but fMRI data shows that the metabolic cost of processing stimuli remains consistent with their innate Jungian orientation.

=== Neurobiology of Intuition and the Default Mode Network (DMN) ===
In Jungian typology, Intuition (N) is described as a perceptive function that operates via the unconscious, focusing on patterns, possibilities, and holistic syntheses rather than concrete sensory data. Neurophysiological evidence supports Jung’s view of these functions as mutually exclusive in their moment-to-peak activation. High activity in the Sensation-related parietal circuits (focusing on the "here and now") typically requires the suppression of the DMN (focusing on "what could be"). This provides a biological basis for Jung's theory of the "inferior function", where the dominance of one perceptive mode physiologically inhibits the other.

== See also ==
- Keirsey Temperament Sorter
- Myers–Briggs Type Indicator
- Personality type
- Psychological astrology
- Socionics
