= Personality type =

Classification of individuals based on personality traits

In psychology, personality type refers to the psychological classification of individuals. In contrast to personality traits, the existence of personality types remains extremely controversial. Types are sometimes said to involve qualitative differences between people, whereas traits might be construed as quantitative differences. According to type theories, for example, introverts and extraverts are two fundamentally different categories of people. According to trait theories, introversion and extraversion are part of a continuous dimension, with many people in the middle.

== Clinically effective personality typologies ==
Effective typologies aim to improve understanding of individuals and predict clinically relevant information, as opposed to diminishing knowledge and understanding as occurs in the case of stereotyping. There is an extensive literature on the topic of classifying the various types of human temperament and an equally extensive literature on personality traits or domains. These classification systems attempt to describe normal temperament and personality and emphasize the predominant features of different temperament and personality types; they are largely the province of the discipline of psychology. Personality disorders, on the other hand, reflect the work of psychiatry, a medical specialty, and are disease-oriented. They are classified in the Diagnostic and Statistical Manual (DSM), a product of the American Psychiatric Association.

== Types vs. traits ==
The term type has not been used consistently in psychology and has become the source of some confusion. Furthermore, because personality test scores usually fall on a bell curve rather than in distinct categories, personality type theories have received considerable criticism among psychometric researchers. One study that directly compared a "type" instrument (the MBTI) to a "trait" instrument (the NEO PI) found that the trait measure was a better predictor of personality disorders. Because of these problems, personality type theories have fallen out of favor in psychology. Most researchers now believe that it is impossible to explain the diversity of human personality with a small number of discrete types. They recommend trait models instead, such as the five-factor model.

== Big Five personality traits ==
The Big Five or five-factor model (FFM) is the dominant framework in contemporary personality research. Unlike type theories, this model has five key, continuous dimensions. The Big Five traits are stable over time and can be applied across cultures. The five traits are often remembered by the acronym OCEAN.

Trait	High scorer	Low scorer	Key facets
Openness	Imaginative, curious, creative	Conventional, practical	fantasy, aesthetics, ideas
Conscientiousness	Organized, dependable, self-disciplined	Flexible, spontaneous	discipline, achievement striving, dutifulness
Extraversion	Sociable, assertive, energetic	Reserved, solitary	warmth, assertiveness, activity
Agreeableness	Cooperative, trusting, empathic	Competitive, skeptical	trust, compliance
Neuroticism	Anxious, moody, easily stressed	Emotionally stable, calm	anxiety, hostility, depression

The Big Five has demonstrated good test-retest reliability, and predictive power for mental health and academic and job performance. Unlike binary type assignments, FFM scores predict incrementally and avoid false dichotomies.

== Type theories ==
- An early form of personality type indicator theory was the Four Temperaments system of Galen, based on the four humours model of Hippocrates; an extended five temperaments system based on the classical theory was published in 1958.
- One example of personality types is Type A and Type B personality theory. According to this theory, impatient, achievement-oriented people are classified as Type A, whereas easy-going, relaxed individuals are designated as Type B. The theory originally suggested that Type A individuals were more at risk for coronary heart disease, but this claim has not been supported by empirical research. One study suggests that people with Type A personalities are more likely to develop personality disorders whereas Type B personalities are more likely to become alcoholics.
- Developmental psychologist Jerome Kagan is a prominent advocate of type indicator theory. He suggests that shy, withdrawn children are best viewed as having an inhibited temperament, which is qualitatively different from that of other children.
- In some cases, trait theorists sometimes use the term type to describe someone who scores exceptionally high or low on a particular personality trait. Hans Eysenck refers to superordinate personality factors as types, and more specific associated traits as traits.
- Several pop psychology theories (e.g., Men Are From Mars, Women Are From Venus, the enneagram) rely on the idea of distinctively different types of people.
- Nancy McWilliams distinguishes eight psychoanalytic personalities: Psychopathic (Antisocial), Narcissistic, Schizoid, Paranoid, Depressive and Manic, Masochistic (Self-Defeating), Obsessive and Compulsive, Hysterical (Histrionic), and one Dissociative psychology.

== Carl Jung ==
One of the more influential ideas originated in the theoretical work of Carl Jung, as published in the book Psychological Types. The original German language edition, Psychologische Typen, was first published by Rascher Verlag, Zurich, in 1921. Jung's theory of psychological types is based on the assumption that there are different functions of consciousness and attitudes of consciousness. Typologies such as Socionics, the MBTI assessment, and the Keirsey Temperament Sorter have their roots in Jungian theory.

Jung's interest in typology grew from his desire to reconcile the theories of Sigmund Freud and Alfred Adler, and to define how his own perspective differed from theirs. Jung wrote, "In attempting to answer this question, I came across the problem of types; for it is one's psychological type which from the outset determines and limits a person's judgment." (Jung, [1961] 1989:207) He concluded that Freud's theory was extraverted and Adler's introverted. (Jung, [1921] 1971: par. 91) Jung became convinced that acrimony between the Adlerian and Freudian camps was due to this unrecognized existence of different fundamental psychological attitudes, which led Jung "to conceive the two controversial theories of neurosis as manifestations of a type-antagonism." (Jung, 1966: par. 64)

=== Four functions of consciousness ===
In the book Jung categorized people into primary types of psychological function.

Jung proposed the existence of two dichotomous pairs of cognitive functions:

- The "rational" (judging) functions: thinking and feeling
- The "irrational" (perceiving) functions: sensation and intuition

Jung went on to suggest that these functions are expressed in either an introverted or extraverted form.

According to Jung, the psyche is an apparatus for adaptation and orientation, and consists of a number of different psychic functions. Among these he distinguishes four basic functions:

- Sensation—perception by means of immediate apprehension of the visible relationship between subject and object
- Intuition—perception of processes in the background; e.g. unconscious drives and/or motivations of other people
- Thinking—function of intellectual cognition; the forming of logical conclusions
- Feeling—function of subjective estimation, value oriented thinking

Thinking and feeling functions are rational, while sensation and intuition are nonrational. According to Jung, rationality consists of figurative thoughts, feelings or actions with reason — a point of view based on a set of criteria and standards. Nonrationality is not based in reason. Jung notes that elementary facts are also nonrational, not because they are illogical but because, as thoughts, they are not judgments.

=== Attitudes: extraversion and introversion ===
Behavioral and psychological characteristics distinguishing introversion and extraversion, which are generally conceived as lying along a continuum.

Analytical psychology distinguishes several psychological types or temperaments.

- Extravert (Jung's spelling, although some dictionaries prefer the variant extrovert)
- Introvert

Extraversion means "outward-turning" and introversion means "inward-turning". These specific definitions vary somewhat from the popular usage of the words.

The preferences for extraversion and introversion are often called attitudes. Each of the cognitive functions can operate in the external world of behavior, action, people, and things (extraverted attitude) or the internal world of ideas and reflection (introverted attitude). People who prefer extraversion draw their energy toward objective, external data. They seek to experience and base their judgments on data from the outer world. Conversely, those who prefer introversion draw their energy toward subjective, internal data. They seek to experience and base their judgments on data from the inner world.

The attitude type could be thought of as the flow of libido (psychic energy). The functions are modified by two main attitude types: extraversion and introversion. In any person, the degree of introversion or extraversion of one function can be quite different from that of another function.

=== Four functions: sensation, intuition, thinking, feeling ===
Jung identified two pairs of psychological functions:

- The two irrational (perception) functions, sensation and intuition
- The two rational (judgment) functions, thinking and feeling

Sensation and intuition are irrational (perception) functions, meaning they gather information. They describe how information is received and experienced. Individuals who prefer sensation are more likely to trust information that is real, concrete, and actual, meaning they seek the information itself. They prefer to look for discernable details. For them, the meaning is in the data. On the other hand, those who prefer intuition tend to trust information that is envisioned or hypothetical, that can be associated with other possible information. They are more interested in hidden possibilities via the unconscious. The meaning is in how or what the information could be.

Thinking and feeling are rational (judgment) functions, meaning they form judgments or make decisions. The thinking and feeling functions are both used to make rational decisions, based on the data received from their information-gathering functions (sensing or intuition). Those who prefer thinking tend to judge things from a more detached standpoint, measuring the decision by what is logical, causal, consistent, and functional. Those who prefer the feeling function tend to form judgments by evaluating the situation; deciding the worth of the situation. They measure the situation by what is pleasant or unpleasant, liked or disliked, harmonious or inharmonious, etc.

As noted already, people who prefer the thinking function do not necessarily, in the everyday sense, "think better" than their feeling counterparts; the opposite preference is considered an equally rational way of coming to decisions (and, in any case, the Jung's typology is a discernment of preference, not ability). Similarly, those who prefer the feeling function do not necessarily have "better" emotional reactions than their thinking counterparts.

=== Dominant function ===
All four functions are used at different times depending on the circumstances. However, one of the four functions is generally used more dominantly and proficiently than the other three, in a more conscious and confident way. According to Jung the dominant function is supported by two auxiliary functions. (In MBTI publications the first auxiliary is usually called the auxiliary or secondary function and the second auxiliary function is usually called the tertiary function.) The fourth and least conscious function is always the opposite of the dominant function. Jung called this the "inferior function" and Myers sometimes also called it the "shadow function".

Jung's typological model regards psychological type as similar to left- or right-handedness: individuals are either born with, or develop, certain preferred ways of thinking and acting. These psychological differences are sorted into four opposite pairs, or dichotomies, with a resulting eight possible psychological types. People tend to find using their opposite psychological preferences more difficult, even if they can become more proficient (and therefore behaviorally flexible) with practice and development.

The four functions operate in conjunction with the attitudes (extraversion and introversion). Each function is used in either an extraverted or introverted way. A person whose dominant function is extraverted intuition, for example, uses intuition very differently from someone whose dominant function is introverted intuition.

The eight psychological types are as follows:

- Extraverted sensation
- Introverted sensation
- Extraverted intuition
- Introverted intuition
- Extraverted thinking
- Introverted thinking
- Extraverted feeling
- Introverted feeling

Jung theorized that the dominant function characterizes consciousness, while its opposite is repressed and characterizes unconscious activity. Generally, we tend to favor our most developed dominant function, while we can broaden our personality by developing the others. Related to this, Jung noted that the unconscious often tends to reveal itself most easily through a person's least developed inferior function. The encounter with the unconscious and development of the underdeveloped functions thus tend to progress together.

When the unconscious inferior functions fail to develop, imbalance results. In Psychological Types, Jung describes in detail the effects of tensions between the complexes associated with the dominant and inferior differentiating functions in highly one-sided individuals.

=== Personality types and worrying ===
The relationship between worry – the tendency of one's thoughts and mental images to revolve around and create negative emotions, and the experience of a frequent level of fear – and Jung's model of psychological types has been the subject of studies. In particular, correlational analysis has shown that the tendency to worry is significantly related to Jung's Introversion and Feeling dimensions. Similarly, worry has shown robust correlations with shyness and fear of social situations. The worrier's tendency to be fearful of social situations might make them appear more withdrawn.

Jung's model suggests that the superordinate dimension of personality is introversion and extraversion. Introverts are likely to relate to the external world by listening, reflecting, being reserved, and having focused interests. Extraverts, on the other hand, are adaptable and in tune with the external world. They prefer interacting with the outer world by talking, actively participating, being sociable, expressive, and having a variety of interests. Jung (1921) also identified two other dimensions of personality: Intuition - Sensing and Thinking - Feeling. Sensing types tend to focus on the reality of present situations, pay close attention to detail, and are concerned with practicalities. Intuitive types focus on envisioning a wide range of possibilities to a situation and favor ideas, concepts, and theories over data. Thinking types use objective and logical reasoning in making their decisions, are more likely to analyze stimuli in a logical and detached manner, be more emotionally stable, and score higher on intelligence. Feeling types make judgments based on subjective and personal values. In interpersonal decision-making, feeling types tend to emphasize compromise to ensure a beneficial solution for everyone. They also tend to be somewhat more neurotic than thinking types. The worrier's tendency to experience a fearful affect, could be manifested in Jung's feeling type.

== See also ==
General overview

- Personality
- Personality psychology
- Personality tests
- Psychological typologies
- Trait theory
- Trait leadership

Three modern theories closely associated with Jung's personality types

- Keirsey Temperament Sorter
- Myers–Briggs Type Indicator
- Socionics

Other theories

- 16 Personality Factors, or the Cattell personality test
- Attitudinal Psyche
- Big Five personality traits
- DISC assessment
- Enneagram of Personality
- Eysenck's three-factor model
- Eysenck Personality Questionnaire
- Five temperaments
- Four temperaments
- Fundamental interpersonal relations orientation
- Gretchen Rubin's four tendencies
- HEXACO model of personality structure
- Holland Codes
- Humorism
- Type A and Type B personality theory
