= Outline of relationships =

Overview of and topical guide to relationships

The following outline is provided as an overview of and topical guide to interpersonal relationships.

Interpersonal relationship – association between two or more people; this association may be based on limerence, love, solidarity, regular business interactions, or some other type of social commitment. Interpersonal relationships are formed in the context of social, cultural, and other influences.

== Essence of relationships ==
- Social relations – relationship between two (i.e. a dyad), three (i.e. a triad) or more individuals (i.e. members of a social group). Social relations, derived from individual agency, form the basis of social structure.
- Social actions – acts which take into account the actions and reactions of individuals (or 'agents'). According to Max Weber, "an action is 'social' if the acting individual takes account of the behavior of others and is thereby oriented in its course."

== Types of relationships ==
=== Membership in a social group ===
Social group – consists of two or more humans who interact with one another, share similar characteristics and collectively have a sense of unity. By this definition, a society can be viewed as a large group, though most social groups are considerably smaller.

- Dyad – group of two people. "Dyadic" is an adjective used to describe this type of communication/interaction. A dyad is the smallest possible social group.
- Triad – group of three people. They are more stable than a dyad. Reduces intense interaction and is based less on personal attachments and more on formal rules and regulations.

==== Household membership ====
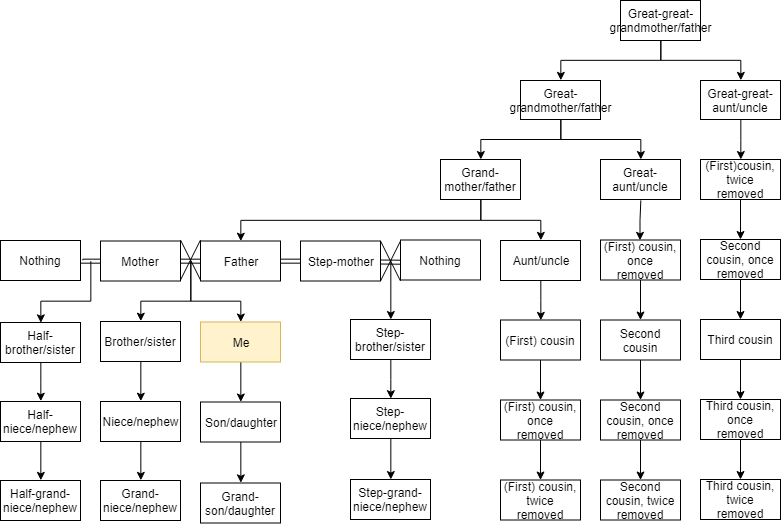
A family tree displaying the terminology of relationships between relatives

Household — one or more persons who share main residence, and share meals or living space

- Single person
- Family
  - Single parent
- Nuclear family (immediate family)
  - Spouse
    - Husband
    - Wife
  - Parent
    - Father
    - Mother
    - Legal guardian
  - Child
    - Son
    - Daughter
  - Sibling
    - Brother
    - Sister
- Stepfamily
  - Stepparent
    - Stepmother
    - Stepfather
  - Stepchild
    - Stepson
    - Stepdaughter
  - Stepsibling
    - Stepbrother
    - Stepsister
- Extended family
  - Grandparent
    - Grandfather
    - Grandmother
  - Grandchild
    - Grandson
    - Granddaughter
  - Uncle
  - Aunt
  - Cousin
  - Nephew
  - Niece
- Family-in-law
  - Father-in-law
  - Mother-in-law
  - Brother-in-law
  - Sister-in-law
- Kinship
  - Consanguinity
  - Affinity
  - Fictive kinship
- Relation change
  - Marriage
  - Adoption
  - Relation end
    - Breakup
    - Divorced
    - Disownment
    - Emancipation
    - Widowhood
- Household aspects
  - Roommate
  - Caregiver
  - Gender roles
  - Household economics
    - Breadwinner model

==== Peer group membership ====
- Peers
- Special interest group
- Pen pals –

==== Organization membership ====
An organization is a social group which distributes tasks for a collective goal. There are a variety of legal types of organizations, including:

- Corporations
- Governments
- Non-governmental organizations
- International organizations
- Armed forces
- Charitable organizations
- Not-for-profit corporations
- Partnerships
- Cooperatives
- Universities

==== Community membership ====
Community

- Citizenship – membership in a country or nation.
- Neighbor – member of a neighborhood.
- Member of society – a society is a body of individuals outlined by the bounds of functional interdependence, possibly comprising characteristics such as national or cultural identity, social solidarity, language, or hierarchical organization.

=== Intimate relationships ===
Intimate relationship

- Cohabitation – living together without being married.
- Committed relationship – interpersonal relationship based upon a mutually agreed-upon commitment to one another involving exclusivity, honesty, trust or some other agreed-upon behavior. The term is most commonly used with informal relationships, such as "going steady", but may encompass any relationship where an expressed commitment is involved.
  - Close friendship – being close friends
  - Courtship
  - Long-term relationship (LT —R)
    - Monogamy – having a single long-term partner or marriage to one person.
    - Polyamory – having multiple long-term lovers and/or partners.
    - Polygamy – marriage to multiple partners.
      - Polyandry – the marriage of a woman to multiple men.
      - Polygyny – the marriage of a man to multiple women.
      - Polygynandry – the marriage of multiple men to multiple women.
  - Free union
  - Engagement or betrothal; the period of time between a marriage proposal and the marriage itself, sometimes accompanied by the formal Church announcement of the intent to marry known as banns.
  - Marriage
    - Marriage partners
      - Husband
      - Wife
    - Types of marriage
      - Arranged marriage
      - Forced marriage
      - Cousin marriage
      - Open marriage
  - Civil union
- Domestic partnership
  - Boyfriend
  - Girlfriend
- Familial relationship – relationship between members of a family. Family members tend to form close personal relationships. See family section above.
- Friendship
- Extramarital affair
- Love–hate relationship
- Romantic friendship
- Relationship anarchy
- Casual relationship

=== Business and professional relationships ===
- Employer-worker relationship
- Coworker
- Contractor
- Customer
- Landlord and tenant

=== Education and school-related relationships ===
- Teacher and student
- Counselor

=== Other types of relationships ===
- Conservatorship
- Enemy
- Frenemy – a person with whom an individual maintains a friendly interaction despite underlying conflict, possibly encompassing rivalry, mistrust, jealousy or competition.
- Godparents
- Mentorship
- Acquaintance

== Relations (relationship activities) ==
- Conflict resolution
- Human bonding
- Interpersonal communication
- Relationship education
- Social rejection
- Wedding

=== Relationship formation ===
Human mating is the process whereby an individual seeks out another individual with the intention of forming a long-term intimate relationship or marriage, but sometimes for casual relationship or friendship.

- Personal advertisement
- Meet market
- Flirting
  - Pick-up line
- Singles event
- Courtship
  - Dating
    - Internet dating
    - Going Dutch
- Endogamy – the practice of marrying within a specific ethnic group, class, or social group, rejecting all others; in contrast to exogamy.
- Hypergamy – act or practice of seeking a spouse of higher socioeconomic status, or caste status than oneself; in contrast to hypogamy.

=== Sexual relations ===
- Human sexual activity
  - Sexual intercourse
  - Swinging

=== Dysfunctional relations ===
- Dysfunctional family
- Relational transgression – violation of implicit or explicit relational rules.

==== Abusive relations ====
Abuse

- Child abuse
- Elder abuse
- Dating abuse
- Domestic violence
- Emotional abuse
  - Verbal abuse
  - Gaslighting
  - Financial abuse
- Infidelity – breach of the expectation of sexual exclusivity. Also called "cheating".
  - Extramarital affair
    - Adultery
    - Extramarital sex
- Neglect
- Spousal abuse

=== End of a relationship ===
- Breaking up
- Divorce
- Legal separation
- Widowhood –

==== Reasons for ending a relationship ====
- Dysfunctional relations – see Dysfunctional relations section above.
- Irreconcilable differences
- Relational transgression – violation of implicit or explicit relational rules.

=== Theories of interpersonal relations ===
- Socionics – theory of intertype relations incorporating Carl Jung's work on personality types with Antoni Kępiński's theory of information metabolism.
- Attachment theory – describes the dynamics of long-term relationships between humans. Its most important tenet is that an infant needs to develop a relationship with at least one primary caregiver for social and emotional development to occur normally.
- Social exchange theory – a social-psychological and sociological perspective that explains social change and stability as a process of negotiated exchanges between parties. Posits that human relationships are formed by a subjective cost-benefit analysis and the comparison of alternatives.
- Relational models theory – a psychological theory authored by Alan Fiske proposing four elementary forms of human relations.

== Relationship characteristics ==
Aspects of relationships include:

- Attachment in adults
- Attachment in children
- Interpersonal attraction – force acting between two people that tends to draw them together and resist their separation, which leads to friendships and romantic relationships. It is distinct from physical attraction.
- New relationship energy (NRE) – state of mind experienced at the beginning of most significant sexual and romantic relationships, typically involving heightened emotional and sexual receptivity and excitement.

=== Stages of a relationship ===
- Stages presented in George Levinger's relationship model:
  1. Acquaintance
  2. Buildup
  3. Continuation
  4. Deterioration
  5. Termination

=== Feelings and emotions ===
- Love
  - Familial love
  - Parental love
  - Marital love
  - Brotherly love
  - Filial piety
  - Veneration
- Romance
- Infatuation
- Intimacy
- Jealousy
- Compersion
- Limerence
- Passion
- Platonic love
- Psychology of sexual monogamy
- Unconditional love

=== Sexual orientation ===
- Asexuality
- Bisexuality
- Heterosexuality
- Homosexuality
- Pansexuality

=== Romantic orientation ===
- Aromanticism
- Biromanticism
- Heteroromanticism
- Homoromanticism
- Panromanticism

== Relationship partners ==
Terms for partners in intimate relationships include:

- Boyfriend/Girlfriend
- Confidant or confidante
- Family member
- Friend or Companion
- Life partner/Partner
- Spouse
- Mistress
- Soulmate
- Significant other
- Sexual partner

== Relationship management ==
- Bride price
  - Dower
  - Dowry
- Brideservice
- Love contract

=== Relationship intervention ===
- Family therapy
- Relationship counseling

== Relationship development ==
Terms for people who want to develop their relationships include:

- People skills
- Communications training
- Emotional intelligence
- Emotional literacy
- Social intelligence
- Social skills
- Socionics

== Lacking an intimate relationship ==
- Spinster
- Celibate

== Romance and intimacy ==
Courtship –

Romance –

- Pet names
- Interpersonal communication
  - Face-to-face
  - Love letter
  - Telephone
  - Internet romance
- Romanticism
  - Poetry
  - Drawing
  - Painting
- Dating
  - Cooking
  - Couple dancing
  - Movies
  - Stargazing
  - Serenade

Intimacy

- Physical intimacy
  - Touching
    - Erogenous zones
  - Cuddling
    - Arm around shoulder
    - Arms around abdomen
    - Head on shoulder
    - Head on lap
    - Hugging
  - Eye contact
  - Holding hands
  - Kissing
    - Nuzzling
- Emotional intimacy
  - Love
  - Acceptance
  - Jealousy
  - Empathy
  - Sympathy
  - Longing

== Other ==
- Emotional contagion – tendency to catch and feel emotions that are similar to and influenced by those of others.
- Casual relationship – sexual relationship without the extra commitments of a more formal romantic relationship.
- Relational disorder – mental disorder attributable to a relationship rather than to any one individual in the relationship.
- Fear of commitment
- Friend zone
- Internet relationship
- Quality time
- Reciprocal liking
- Respect
- Sexual capital
- Term of endearment
- Roommate
- Interpersonal attraction
- Broken heart
- Long-distance relationship
- Marriage – a socially binding commitment to a partner
- Female-led relationship – romantic commitment where the woman is the lead and/or principle partner; often referred to as an FLR
- Sexual infidelity – having a sexual relationship outside of a relationship that includes a commitment to have no other sexual partners
- Sexual fidelity – not having other sexual partners other than one's committed partner, even temporarily
- Serial monogamy – having a series of monogamous relationships, one after the other
- Polyamory – encompasses a wide range of relationships, including those above: polyamorous relationships may include both committed and casual relationships
- Relationship anarchy – a theory that questions the idea of love as a special, limited feeling that is only real if it is restricted to two people only, at any given moment.
- Sexual promiscuity – having casual sexual partners at will (compare with chastity)
- Affection
- Casual dating
- Kiss
- Kissing traditions
- Emotional intimacy
- Female bonding
- Life partner
- Limbic resonance
- MHC in sexual mate selection

== See also ==
- Outline of human sexuality
