= Athanase Dupré =

French mathematician and physicist

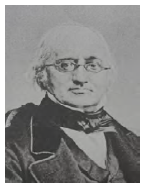
- Born: 28 December 1808
- Died: 10 August 1869 (aged 60)
- Scientific career
- Fields: Mathematics, physics
- Thesis: Sur le phosphore et ses combinaisons binaires, et en particulier sur les combinaisons du phosphore avec le soufre (1840)

Louis Victoire Athanase Dupré (28 December 1808 – 10 August 1869) was a French mathematician and physicist noted for his 1860s publications on the mechanical theory of heat (thermodynamics); work that was said to have inspired the publications of engineer François Massieu and his Massieu functions; which in turn inspired the work of American engineer Willard Gibbs and his fundamental equations.

== See also ==
- Young–Dupré equation
