= Entropy and life =

Influence of thermodynamics on evolution

Research concerning the relationship between the thermodynamic quantity entropy and both the origin and evolution of life began around the turn of the 20th century. In 1910 American historian Henry Adams printed and distributed to university libraries and history professors the small volume A Letter to American Teachers of History proposing a theory of history based on the second law of thermodynamics and on the principle of entropy.

The 1944 book What is Life? by Nobel-laureate physicist Erwin Schrödinger stimulated further research in the field. In his book, Schrödinger originally stated that life feeds on negative entropy, or negentropy as it is sometimes called, but in a later edition corrected himself in response to complaints and stated that the true source is free energy. More recent work has restricted the discussion to Gibbs free energy because biological processes on Earth normally occur at a constant temperature and pressure, such as in the atmosphere or at the bottom of the ocean, but not across both over short periods of time for individual organisms. The quantitative application of entropy balances and Gibbs energy considerations to individual cells is one of the underlying principles of growth and metabolism.

Ideas about the relationship between entropy and living organisms have inspired hypotheses and speculations in many contexts, including psychology, information theory, the origin of life, and the possibility of extraterrestrial life.

== Early views ==
In 1863 Rudolf Clausius published his noted memoir On the Concentration of Rays of Heat and Light, and on the Limits of Its Action, wherein he outlined a preliminary relationship, based on his own work and that of William Thomson (Lord Kelvin), between living processes and his newly developed concept of entropy. Building on this, one of the first to speculate on a possible thermodynamic perspective of organic evolution was the Austrian physicist Ludwig Boltzmann. In 1875, building on the works of Clausius and Kelvin, Boltzmann reasoned:

The general struggle for existence of animate beings is not a struggle for raw materials – these, for organisms, are air, water and soil, all abundantly available – nor for energy which exists in plenty in any body in the form of heat, but a struggle for [negative] entropy, which becomes available through the transition of energy from the hot sun to the cold earth.

In 1876 American civil engineer Richard Sears McCulloh, in his Treatise on the Mechanical Theory of Heat and its Application to the Steam-Engine, which was an early thermodynamics textbook, states, after speaking about the laws of the physical world, that "there are none that are established on a firmer basis than the two general propositions of Joule and Carnot; which constitute the fundamental laws of our subject." McCulloh then goes on to show that these two laws may be combined in a single expression as follows:

$$S = \int { dQ \over \tau }$$

where

$S =$ entropy
$dQ =$ a differential amount of heat passed into a thermodynamic system
$\tau =$ absolute temperature

McCulloh then declares that the applications of these two laws, i.e. what are currently known as the first law of thermodynamics and the second law of thermodynamics, are innumerable:

When we reflect how generally physical phenomena are connected with thermal changes and relations, it at once becomes obvious that there are few, if any, branches of natural science which are not more or less dependent upon the great truths under consideration. Nor should it, therefore, be a matter of surprise that already, in the short space of time, not yet one generation, elapsed since the mechanical theory of heat has been freely adopted, whole branches of physical science have been revolutionized by it.

McCulloh gives a few of what he calls the "more interesting examples" of the application of these laws in extent and utility. His first example is physiology, wherein he states that "the body of an animal, not less than a steamer, or a locomotive, is truly a heat engine, and the consumption of food in the one is precisely analogous to the burning of fuel in the other; in both, the chemical process is the same: that called combustion." He then incorporates a discussion of Antoine Lavoisier's theory of respiration with cycles of digestion, excretion, and perspiration, but then contradicts Lavoisier with recent findings, such as internal heat generated by friction, according to the new theory of heat, which, according to McCulloh, states that the "heat of the body generally and uniformly is diffused instead of being concentrated in the chest". McCulloh then gives an example of the second law, where he states that friction, especially in the smaller blood vessels, must develop heat. Undoubtedly, some fraction of the heat generated by animals is produced in this way. He then asks: "but whence the expenditure of energy causing that friction, and which must be itself accounted for?"

To answer this question he turns to the mechanical theory of heat and goes on to loosely outline how the heart is what he calls a "force-pump", which receives blood and sends it to every part of the body, as discovered by William Harvey, and which "acts like the piston of an engine and is dependent upon and consequently due to the cycle of nutrition and excretion which sustains physical or organic life". It is likely that McCulloh modeled parts of this argument on that of the famous Carnot cycle. In conclusion, he summarizes his first and second law argument as such:

Everything physical being subject to the law of conservation of energy, it follows that no physiological action can take place except with expenditure of energy derived from food; also, that an animal performing mechanical work must from the same quantity of food generate less heat than one abstaining from exertion, the difference being precisely the heat equivalent of that of work.

== Negative entropy ==
In the 1944 book What is Life?, Austrian physicist Erwin Schrödinger, who in 1933 had won the Nobel Prize in Physics, theorized that life – contrary to the general tendency dictated by the second law of thermodynamics, which states that the entropy of an isolated system cannot decrease – maintains a relatively low entropy by exchanging energy and matter with its environment, while producing and exporting entropy. The apparent tension between the organization of living systems and the second law of thermodynamics is sometimes described as the Schrödinger paradox. In his note to Chapter 6 of What is Life?, however, Schrödinger remarks on his usage of the term negative entropy:

Let me say first, that if I had been catering for them [physicists] alone I should have let the discussion turn on free energy instead. It is the more familiar notion in this context. But this highly technical term seemed linguistically too near to energy for making the average reader alive to the contrast between the two things.

This, Schrödinger argues, helps explain how living systems maintain their organization despite the second law of thermodynamics. In this direction, although life's dynamics may be argued to go against the tendency of the second law, life does not in any way conflict with or invalidate this law, because the principle that the total entropy of an isolated system cannot decrease applies to an isolated system, meaning no heat can enter or leave, and the physical and chemical processes which make life possible do not occur in thermally isolated, meaning no heat can enter or leave; a fully isolated system exchanges neither heat nor matter nor work with its surroundings. An open system can decrease its entropy by exporting entropy to its surroundings, provided the total entropy change of the system and its surroundings is consistent with the second law.

Schrödinger asked the question: "How does the living organism avoid decay?" The obvious answer is: "By eating, drinking, breathing and (in the case of plants) assimilating." While energy from nutrients is necessary to sustain an organism's order, Schrödinger also presciently postulated the existence of other molecules equally necessary for creating the order observed in living organisms: "An organism's astonishing gift of concentrating a stream of order on itself and thus escaping the decay into atomic chaos – of drinking orderliness from a suitable environment – seems to be connected with the presence of the aperiodic solids..." We now know that this "aperiodic" crystal is DNA, and that its irregular arrangement is a form of information. "The DNA in the cell nucleus contains the master copy of the software, in duplicate. This software seems to control by specifying an algorithm, or set of instructions, for creating and maintaining the entire organism containing the cell."

DNA and other macromolecules determine an organism's life cycle: birth, growth, maturity, decline, and death. Nutrition is necessary but not sufficient to account for growth in size, as genetics is the governing factor. At some point, virtually all organisms normally decline and die even while remaining in environments that contain sufficient nutrients to sustain life. The controlling factor must be internal and not nutrients or sunlight acting as causal exogenous variables. Organisms inherit the ability to create unique and complex biological structures; it is unlikely for those capabilities to be reinvented or to be taught to each generation. Therefore, DNA must be operative as the prime cause in this characteristic as well. Applying Boltzmann's perspective of the second law, the change of state from a more probable, less ordered, and higher entropy arrangement to one of less probability, more order, and lower entropy (as is seen in biological ordering) calls for a function like that known of DNA. DNA's apparent information-processing function provides a resolution of the Schrödinger paradox posed by life and the entropy requirement of the second law.

== Gibbs free energy and biological evolution ==
In recent years, the thermodynamic interpretation of evolution in relation to entropy has begun to use the concept of the Gibbs free energy, rather than entropy. This is because biological processes on Earth take place at roughly constant temperature and pressure, a situation in which the Gibbs free energy is an especially useful way to express the second law of thermodynamics. The Gibbs free energy is given by:

$$\Delta G \equiv \Delta H-T \, \Delta S$$

where

$G =$ Gibbs free energy
$H =$ enthalpy passed into a thermodynamic system
$T =$ absolute temperature of the system
$S =$ entropy

and exergy and Gibbs free energy are equivalent if the environment and system temperature are equivalent. Otherwise, Gibbs free energy will be less than the exergy (for systems with temperatures above ambient). The minimization of the Gibbs free energy is a form of the principle of minimum energy (minimum 'free' energy or exergy), which follows from the entropy maximization principle for closed systems. Moreover, the Gibbs free energy equation, in modified form, can be used for open systems, including situations where chemical potential terms are included in the energy balance equation. In a popular 1982 textbook, Principles of Biochemistry, noted American biochemist Albert Lehninger argued that the order produced within cells as they grow and divide is more than compensated for by the disorder they create in their surroundings in the course of growth and division. In short, according to Lehninger, "Living organisms preserve their internal order by taking from their surroundings free energy, in the form of nutrients or sunlight, and returning to their surroundings an equal amount of energy as heat and entropy."

Similarly, according to the chemist John Avery, from his 2003 book Information Theory and Evolution, we find a presentation in which the phenomenon of life, including its origin and evolution, as well as human cultural evolution, has its basis in the background of thermodynamics, statistical mechanics, and information theory. The (apparent) paradox between the second law of thermodynamics and the high degree of order and complexity produced by living systems, according to Avery, has its resolution "in the information content of the Gibbs free energy that enters the biosphere from outside sources."

In a study titled "Natural selection for least action" published in the Proceedings of the Royal Society A., Ville Kaila and Arto Annila of the University of Helsinki describe how the process of natural selection responsible for such local increase in order may be mathematically derived directly from the expression of the second law equation for connected non-equilibrium open systems. The second law of thermodynamics can be written as an equation of motion to describe evolution, showing how natural selection and the principle of least action can be connected by expressing natural selection in terms of chemical thermodynamics. In this view, evolution explores possible paths to level differences in energy densities and so increase entropy most rapidly. Thus, an organism serves as an energy transfer mechanism, and beneficial mutations allow successive organisms to transfer more energy within their environment.

== Counteracting the second law tendency ==
Second-law analysis is valuable in scientific and engineering analysis in that it provides a number of benefits over energy analysis alone, including the basis for determining energy quality (or exergy content), understanding fundamental physical phenomena, improving performance evaluation and optimization, or in furthering our understanding of living systems.

The second law describes a universal tendency towards disorder and uniformity, or internal and external equilibrium. This means that real, non-ideal processes cause entropy production. Entropy can also be transferred to or from a system as well by the flow or transfer of matter and energy. As a result, entropy production does not necessarily cause the entropy of the system to increase. In fact the entropy or disorder in a system can spontaneously decrease, such as an aircraft gas turbine engine cooling down after shutdown, or like water in a cup left outside in sub-freezing winter temperatures. In the latter, a relatively unordered liquid cools and spontaneously freezes into a crystallized structure of reduced disorder as the molecules 'stick' together. Although the entropy of the system decreases, the system approaches uniformity with, or becomes more thermodynamically similar to its surroundings. This is a category III process, referring to the four combinations of either entropy (S) up or down, and uniformity (Y) – between system and its environment – either up or down.

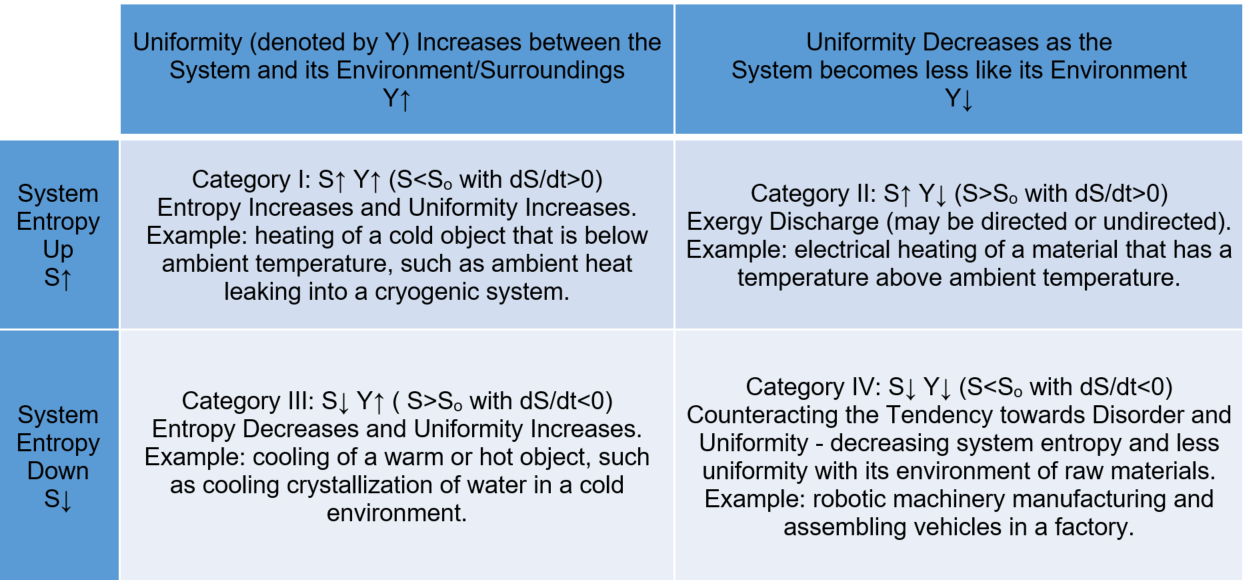
Four categories of processes given entropy up or down and uniformity up or down

The second law can be conceptually stated as follows: Matter and energy have the tendency to reach a state of uniformity or internal and external equilibrium, a state of maximum disorder (entropy). Real non-equilibrium processes always produce entropy, causing increased disorder in the universe, while idealized reversible processes produce no entropy and no process is known to exist that destroys entropy. The tendency of a system to approach uniformity may be counteracted, and the system may become more ordered or complex, by the combination of two things, a work or exergy source and some form of instruction or intelligence. Where 'exergy' is the thermal, mechanical, electric or chemical work potential of an energy source or flow, and 'instruction or intelligence', is understood in the context of, or characterized by, the set of processes that are within category IV.

Consider as an example of a category IV process, robotic manufacturing and assembly of vehicles in a factory. The robotic machinery requires electrical work input and instructions, but when completed, the manufactured products have less uniformity with their surroundings, or more complexity (higher order) relative to the raw materials they were made from. Thus, system entropy or disorder decreases while the tendency towards uniformity between the system and its environment is counteracted. In this example, the instructions, as well as the source of work may be internal or external to the system, and they may or may not cross the system boundary. To illustrate, the instructions may be pre-coded and the electrical work may be stored in an energy storage system on-site. Alternatively, the control of the machinery may be by remote operation over a communications network, while the electric work is supplied to the factory from the local electric grid. In addition, humans may directly play, in whole or in part, the role that the robotic machinery plays in manufacturing. In this case, instructions may be involved, but intelligence is either directly responsible, or indirectly responsible, for the direction or application of work in such a way as to counteract the tendency towards disorder and uniformity.

As another example, consider the refrigeration of water in a warm environment. Due to refrigeration, heat is extracted or forced to flow from the water. As a result, the temperature and entropy of the water decreases, and the system moves further away from uniformity with its warm surroundings. The important point is that refrigeration not only requires a source of work, it requires designed equipment, as well as pre-coded or direct operational intelligence or instructions to achieve the desired refrigeration effect.

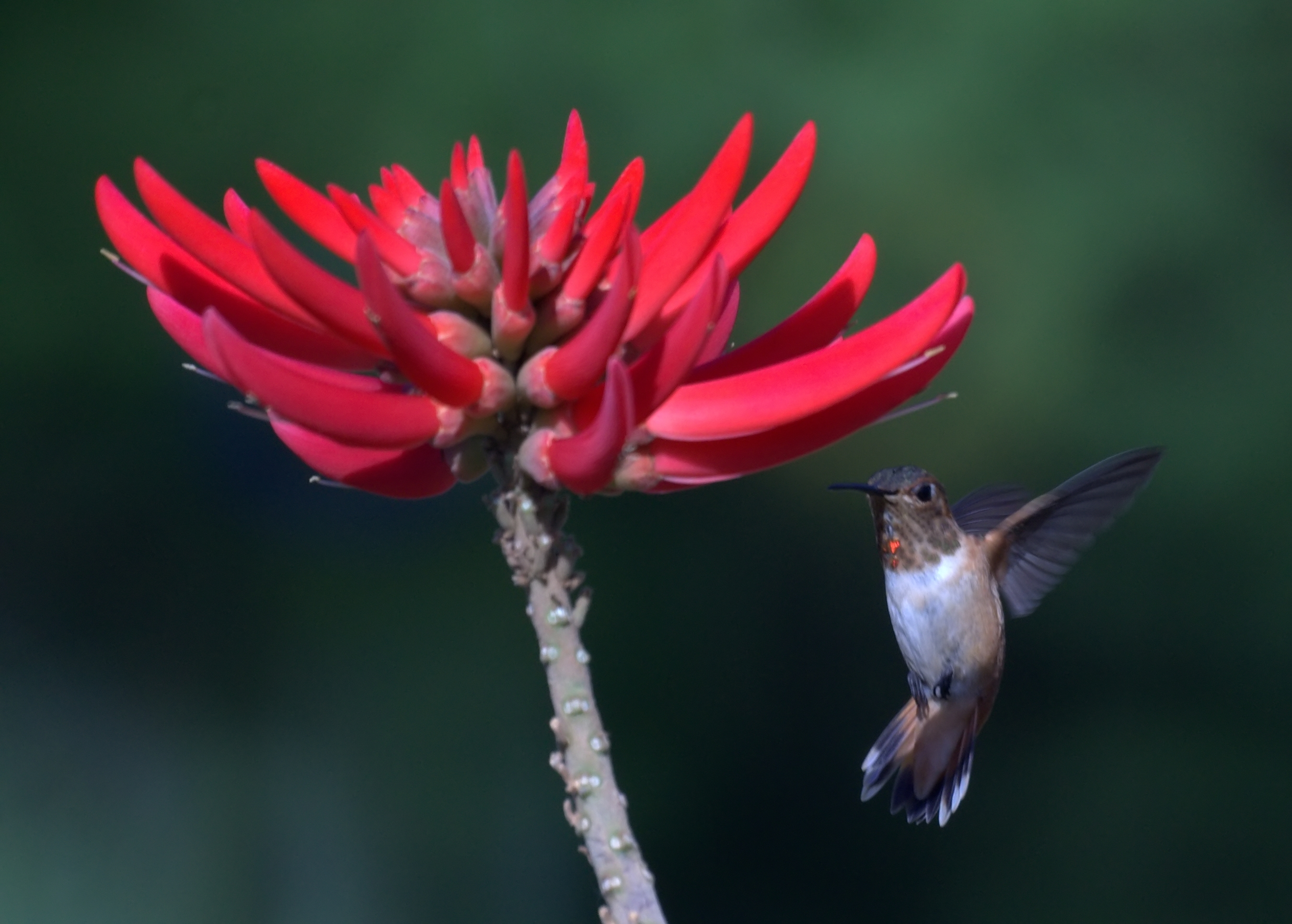
Hummingbird in flight.

Observation is the basis for the understanding that category IV processes require both a source of exergy as well as a source or form of intelligence or instruction. With respect to living systems, sunlight provides the source of exergy for virtually all life on Earth, i.e. sunlight directly (for flora) or indirectly in food (for fauna). Note that the work potential or exergy of sunlight, with a certain spectral and directional distribution, will have a specific value that can be expressed as a percentage of the energy flow or exergy content. Like the Earth as a whole, living things use this energy, converting the energy to other forms (the first law), while producing entropy (the second law), and thereby degrading the exergy or quality of the energy. Sustaining life, or the growth of a seed, for example, requires continual arranging of atoms and molecules into elaborate assemblies required to duplicate living cells. This assembly in living organisms decreases uniformity and disorder, counteracting the universal tendency towards disorder and uniformity described by the second law. In addition to a high quality energy source, counteracting this tendency requires a form of instruction or intelligence, which is contained primarily in the DNA/RNA.

In the absence of instruction or intelligence, high quality energy is not enough on its own to produce complex assemblies, such as a house. As an example of category I in contrast to IV, although having a lot of energy or exergy, a second tornado will never re-construct a town destroyed by a previous tornado, instead it increases disorder and uniformity (category I), the very tendency described by the second law. A related line of reasoning is that, even though improbable, over billions of years or trillions of chances, did life come about undirected, from non-living matter in the absence of any intelligence? Related questions someone can ask include; can humans with a supply of food (exergy) live without DNA/RNA, or can a house supplied with electricity be built in the forest without humans or a source of instruction or programming, or can a fridge run with electricity but without its functioning computer control boards?

The second law guarantees, that if we build a house it will, over time, have the tendency to fall apart or tend towards a state of disorder. On the other hand, if on walking through a forest we discover a house, we likely conclude that somebody built it, rather than concluding the order came about randomly. We know that living systems, such as the structure and function of a living cell, or the process of protein assembly/folding, are exceedingly complex. Could life have come about without being directed by a source of intelligence – consequently, over time, resulting in such things as the human brain and its intelligence, computers, cities, the quality of love, and the creation of music or fine art? The second law tendency towards disorder and uniformity, and the distinction of category IV processes as counteracting this natural tendency, offers valuable insight for us to consider in our search to answer these questions.

== Entropy of individual cells ==
Entropy balancing

An entropy balance for an open system, or the change in entropy over time for a system at steady state, can be written as:

$\frac{dS}{dT} = \frac{\dot{Q}}{T} + \sum_{B} S_{B}\cdot d n_B + \delta S_{gen}$

Assuming a steady state system, roughly stable pressure-temperature conditions, and exchange through cell surfaces only, this expression can be rewritten to express entropy balance for an individual cell as:

$\frac{dS}{dT} = \frac{\dot{Q}}{T} + \sum_{B} S_B \cdot \dot{n}_B - S_X \cdot |\dot{n}_X| + \dot{S}_{gen} =0$

Where

$\frac{\dot{Q}}{T} =$ heat exchange with the environment

$S_B =$ partial molar entropy of metabolite B

$S_X =$ partial molar entropy of structures resulting from growth

$\dot{S}_{gen} =$ rate of entropy production

and $\dot{n}$ terms indicate rates of exchange with the environment.

This equation can be adapted to describe the entropy balance of a cell, which is useful in reconciling the spontaneity of cell growth with the intuition that the development of complex structures must overall decrease entropy within the cell. From the second law, $\dot{S}_{gen} > 0$; due to internal organization resulting from growth, $S_X$ will be small. Metabolic processes force the sum of the remaining two terms to be less than zero through either a large rate of heat transfer or the export of high entropy waste products. Both mechanisms prevent excess entropy from building up inside the growing cell; the latter is what Schrödinger described as feeding on negative entropy, or "negentropy".

Implications for metabolism

In fact it is possible for this "negentropy" contribution to be large enough that growth is fully endothermic, or actually removes heat from the environment. This type of metabolism, in which acetate, methanol, or a number of other hydrocarbon compounds are converted to methane (a high entropy gas), is known as acetoclastic methanogenesis; one example is the metabolism of the anaerobic archaebacteria Methanosarcina barkeri. At the opposite extreme is the metabolism of anaerobic thermophile archaebacteria Methanobacterium thermoautotrophicum, for which the heat exported into the environment through $\ce{CO_2}$ fixation is high (~3730 kJ/C-mol).

Generally, in metabolic processes, spontaneous catabolic processes that break down biomolecules provide the energy to drive non-spontaneous anabolic reactions that build organized biomass from high entropy reactants. Therefore, biomass yield is determined by the balance between coupled catabolic and anabolic processes, where the relationship between these processes can be described by:

$\Delta_r G_s = (1-Y_{X/S}) \Delta G_{catabolism} + Y_{X/S} \Delta G_{anabolism}$

where

$\Delta_r G_s =$ total reaction driving force/ overall molar Gibbs energy

$Y_{X/S} =$ biomass produced

$\Delta G_{catabolism} =$ Gibbs energy of catabolic reactions (-)

$\Delta G_{anabolism} =$ Gibbs energy of anabolic reactions (+)

Organisms must maintain some optimal balance between $\Delta_r G_s$ and $Y_{X/S}$ to both avoid thermodynamic equilibrium ($\Delta_r G_s = 0$), at which biomass production would be theoretically maximized but metabolism would proceed at an infinitely slow rate, and the opposite limiting case at which growth is highly favorable ($\Delta_r G_s << 0$), but biomass yields are prohibitively low. This relationship is best described in general terms, and will vary widely from organism to organism. Because the terms corresponding to catabolic and anabolic contributions would be roughly balanced in the former scenario, this case represents the maximum amount of organized matter that can be produced in accordance with the 2nd law of thermodynamics for a very generalized metabolic system.

== Entropy and the origin of life ==
The second law of thermodynamics applied to the origin of life is a far more complicated issue than the further development of life, since there is no "standard model" of how the first biological lifeforms emerged, only a number of competing hypotheses. The problem is discussed within the context of abiogenesis, implying gradual pre-Darwinian chemical evolution.

=== Relationship to prebiotic chemistry ===
In 1924 Alexander Oparin suggested that sufficient energy for generating early life forms from non-living molecules was provided in a "primordial soup". The laws of thermodynamics impose some constraints on the earliest life-sustaining reactions that would have emerged and evolved from such a mixture. Essentially, to remain consistent with the second law of thermodynamics, self organizing systems that are characterized by lower entropy values than equilibrium must dissipate energy so as to increase entropy in the external environment. One consequence of this is that low entropy or high chemical potential chemical intermediates cannot build up to very high levels if the reaction leading to their formation is not coupled to another chemical reaction that releases energy. These reactions often take the form of redox couples, which must have been provided by the environment at the time of the origin of life. In today's biology, many of these reactions require catalysts (or enzymes) to proceed, which frequently contain transition metals. This means identifying both redox couples and metals that are readily available in a given candidate environment for abiogenesis is an important aspect of prebiotic chemistry.

The idea that processes that can occur naturally in the environment and act to locally decrease entropy must be identified has been applied in examinations of phosphate's role in the origin of life, where the relevant setting for abiogenesis is an early Earth lake environment. One such process is the ability of phosphate to concentrate reactants selectively due to its localized negative charge.

In the context of the alkaline hydrothermal vent (AHV) hypothesis for the origin of life, a framing of lifeforms as "entropy generators" has been suggested in an attempt to develop a framework for abiogenesis under alkaline deep sea conditions. Assuming life develops rapidly under certain conditions, experiments may be able to recreate the first metabolic pathway, as it would be the most energetically favorable and therefore likely to occur. In this case, iron sulfide compounds may have acted as the first catalysts. Therefore, within the larger framing of life as free energy converters, it would eventually be beneficial to characterize quantities such as entropy production and proton gradient dissipation rates quantitatively for origin of life relevant systems (particularly AHVs).

=== Other theories ===
The evolution of order, manifested as biological complexity, in living systems and the generation of order in certain non-living systems was proposed to obey a common fundamental principal called "the Darwinian dynamic". The Darwinian dynamic was formulated by first considering how microscopic order is generated in relatively simple non-biological systems that are far from thermodynamic equilibrium (e.g. tornadoes, hurricanes). Consideration was then extended to short, replicating RNA molecules assumed to be similar to the earliest forms of life in the RNA world. It was shown that the underlying order-generating processes in the non-biological systems and in replicating RNA are basically similar. This approach helps clarify the relationship of thermodynamics to evolution as well as the empirical content of Darwin's theory.

In 2009 physicist Karo Michaelian published a thermodynamic dissipation theory for the origin of life in which the fundamental molecules of life; nucleic acids, amino acids, carbohydrates (sugars), and lipids are considered to have been originally produced as microscopic dissipative structures (through Prigogine's dissipative structuring) as pigments at the ocean surface to absorb and dissipate into heat the UVC flux of solar light arriving at Earth's surface during the Archean, just as do organic pigments in the visible region today. These UVC pigments were formed through photochemical dissipative structuring from more common and simpler precursor molecules like HCN and H_{2}O under the UVC flux of solar light. The thermodynamic function of the original pigments (fundamental molecules of life) was to increase the entropy production of the incipient biosphere under the solar photon flux and this, in fact, remains as the most important thermodynamic function of the biosphere today, but now mainly in the visible region where photon intensities are higher and biosynthetic pathways are more complex, allowing pigments to be synthesized from lower energy visible light instead of UVC light which no longer reaches Earth's surface.

Jeremy England developed a hypothesis of the physics of the origins of life, that he calls 'dissipation-driven adaptation'. The hypothesis holds that random groups of molecules can self-organize to more efficiently absorb and dissipate heat from the environment. His hypothesis states that such self-organizing systems are an inherent part of the physical world.

== Other types of entropy and their use in defining life ==
Like a thermodynamic system, an information system has an analogous concept to entropy called information entropy. Here, entropy is a measure of the increase or decrease in the novelty of information. Path flows of novel information show a familiar pattern. They tend to increase or decrease the number of possible outcomes in the same way that measures of thermodynamic entropy increase or decrease the state space. Like thermodynamic entropy, information entropy uses a logarithmic scale: –P(x) log P(x), where P is the probability of some outcome x. Reductions in information entropy are associated with a smaller number of possible outcomes in the information system.

In 1984 Brooks and Wiley introduced the concept of species entropy as a measure of the sum of entropy reduction within species populations in relation to free energy in the environment. Brooks-Wiley entropy looks at three categories of entropy changes: information, cohesion and metabolism. Information entropy here measures the efficiency of the genetic information in recording all the potential combinations of heredity which are present. Cohesion entropy looks at the sexual linkages within a population. Metabolic entropy is the familiar chemical entropy used to compare the population to its ecosystem. The sum of these three is a measure of nonequilibrium entropy that drives evolution at the population level.

A 2022 article by Helman in Acta Biotheoretica suggests identifying a divergence measure of these three types of entropies: thermodynamic entropy, information entropy and species entropy. Where these three are overdetermined, there will be a formal freedom that arises similar to how chirality arises from a minimum number of dimensions. Once there are at least four points for atoms, for example, in a molecule that has a central atom, left and right enantiomers are possible. By analogy, once a threshold of overdetermination in entropy is reached in living systems, there will be an internal state space that allows for ordering of systems operations. That internal ordering process is a threshold for distinguishing living from nonliving systems.

== Entropy and the search for extraterrestrial life ==
In 1964 James Lovelock was among a group of scientists requested by NASA to make a theoretical life-detection system to look for life on Mars during the upcoming Viking missions. A significant challenge was determining how to construct a test that would reveal the presence of extraterrestrial life with significant differences from biology as we know it. In considering this problem, Lovelock asked two questions: "How can we be sure that the Martian way of life, if any, will reveal itself to tests based on Earth's life style?", as well as the more challenging underlying question: "What is life, and how should it be recognized?"

Because these ideas conflicted with more traditional approaches that assume biological signatures on other planets would look much like they do on Earth, in discussing this issue with some of his colleagues at the Jet Propulsion Laboratory, he was asked what he would do to look for life on Mars instead. To this, Lovelock replied "I'd look for an entropy reduction, since this must be a general characteristic of life." This idea was perhaps better phrased as a search for sustained chemical disequilibria associated with low entropy states resulting from biological processes, and through further collaboration developed into the hypothesis that biosignatures would be detectable through examining atmospheric compositions. Lovelock determined through studying the atmosphere of Earth that this metric would indeed have the potential to reveal the presence of life. This had the consequence of indicating that Mars was most likely lifeless, as its atmosphere lacks any such anomalous signature.

This work has been extended recently as a basis for biosignature detection in exoplanetary atmospheres. Essentially, the detection of multiple gases that are not typically in stable equilibrium with one another in a planetary atmosphere may indicate biotic production of one or more of them, in a way that does not require assumptions about the exact biochemical reactions extraterrestrial life might use or the specific products that would result. A terrestrial example is the coexistence of methane and oxygen, both of which would eventually deplete if not for continuous biogenic production. The amount of disequilibrium can be described by differencing observed and equilibrium state Gibbs energies for a given atmosphere composition; it can be shown that this quantity has been directly affected by the presence of life throughout Earth's history. Imaging of exoplanets by future ground and space based telescopes will provide observational constraints on exoplanet atmosphere compositions, to which this approach could be applied.

But there is a caveat related to the potential for chemical disequilibria to serve as an anti-biosignature depending on the context. In fact, there was probably a strong chemical disequilibrium present on early Earth before the origin of life due to a combination of the products of sustained volcanic outgassing and oceanic water vapor. In this case, the disequilibrium was the result of a lack of organisms present to metabolize the resulting compounds. This imbalance would actually be decreased by the presence of chemotrophic life, which would remove these atmospheric gases and create more thermodynamic equilibrium prior to the advent of photosynthetic ecosystems.

In 2013 Azua-Bustos and Vega argued that, disregarding the types of lifeforms that might be envisioned both on Earth and elsewhere in the Universe, all should share in common the attribute of decreasing their internal entropy at the expense of free energy obtained from their surroundings. As entropy allows the quantification of the degree of disorder in a system, any envisioned lifeform must have a higher degree of order than its immediate supporting environment. These authors showed that by using fractal mathematics analysis alone, they could readily quantify the degree of structural complexity difference (and thus entropy) of living processes as distinct entities separate from their similar abiotic surroundings. This approach may allow the future detection of unknown forms of life both in the Solar System and on recently discovered exoplanets based on nothing more than entropy differentials of complementary datasets (morphology, coloration, temperature, pH, isotopic composition, etc.).

== Entropy in psychology ==
The notion of entropy as disorder has been transferred from thermodynamics to psychology by Polish psychiatrist Antoni Kępiński, who admitted being inspired by Erwin Schrödinger. In his theoretical framework devised to explain mental disorders (the information metabolism theory), the difference between living organisms and other systems was explained as the ability to maintain order. Contrary to inanimate matter, organisms maintain the particular order of their bodily structures and inner worlds which they impose onto their surroundings and forward to new generations. The life of an organism or the species ceases as soon as it loses that ability. Maintenance of that order requires continual exchange of information between the organism and its surroundings. In higher organisms, information is acquired mainly through sensory receptors and metabolised in the nervous system. The result is action – some form of motion, for example locomotion, speech, internal motion of organs, secretion of hormones, etc. The reactions of one organism become an informational signal to other organisms. Information metabolism, which allows living systems to maintain the order, is possible only if a hierarchy of value exists, as the signals coming to the organism must be structured. In humans that hierarchy has three levels, i.e. biological, emotional, and sociocultural. Kępiński explained how various mental disorders are caused by distortions of that hierarchy, and that the return to mental health is possible through its restoration.

The idea was continued by Struzik, who proposed that Kępiński's information metabolism theory may be seen as an extension of Léon Brillouin's negentropy principle of information. In 2011, the notion of "psychological entropy" was reintroduced to psychologists by Hirsh et al. Similarly to Kępiński, these authors noted that uncertainty management is a critical ability for any organism. Uncertainty, arising due to the conflict between competing perceptual and behavioral affordances, is experienced subjectively as anxiety. Hirsh and his collaborators proposed that both the perceptual and behavioral domains may be conceptualized as probability distributions and that the amount of uncertainty associated with a given perceptual or behavioral experience can be quantified in terms of Claude Shannon's entropy formula.

== Objections ==
Entropy is well defined for equilibrium systems, so objections to the extension of the second law and of entropy to biological systems, especially as it pertains to its use to support or discredit the theory of evolution, have been stated. Living systems and indeed many other systems and processes in the universe operate far from equilibrium.

However, entropy is well defined much more broadly based on the probabilities of a system's states, whether or not the system is a dynamic one (for which equilibrium could be relevant). Even in those physical systems where equilibrium could be relevant, (1) living systems cannot persist in isolation, and (2) the second principle of thermodynamics does not require that free energy be transformed into entropy along the shortest path: living organisms absorb energy from sunlight or from energy-rich chemical compounds and finally return part of such energy to the environment as entropy (generally in the form of heat and low free-energy compounds such as water and carbon dioxide).

The Belgian scientist Ilya Prigogine has, throughout all his research, contributed to this line of study and attempted to solve those conceptual limits, winning the Nobel prize in 1977. One of his major contributions was the concept of the dissipative system, which describes the thermodynamics of open systems in non-equilibrium states.

Also, the Loschmidt's paradox Loschmidt stated in 1876 criticizes the second law by pointing out that if there is a motion of a system from time t_{0} to time t_{1} to time t_{2} that leads to a steady decrease of H (increase of entropy) with time, then there is another allowed state of motion of the system at t_{1}, found by reversing all the velocities, in which H must increase.

== See also ==
- Abiogenesis
- Adaptive system
- Complex systems
- Dissipative system
- Ecological entropy – a measure of biodiversity in the study of biological ecology
- Ectropy – a measure of the tendency of a dynamical system to do useful work and grow more organized
- Entropy (order and disorder)
- Extropy – a metaphorical term defining the extent of a living or organizational system's intelligence, functional order, vitality, energy, life, experience, and capacity and drive for improvement and growth
- Negentropy – a shorthand colloquial phrase for negative entropy
- Self-organization - In non-equilibrium thermodynamics, entropy and dissipative structures are connected to self-organization phenomenon (patterning, orderliness). Life systems and its subsystems are dissipative structures with some degree of self-organization.
