= Information metabolism =

Psychological theory of interaction between biological organisms and their environment

Information metabolism, sometimes referred to as informational metabolism or energetic-informational metabolism, is a psychological theory of interaction between biological organisms and their environment, developed by Polish psychiatrist Antoni Kępiński.

== Overview ==
Kępiński described his psychological theory in several books but the most detailed description is given in his 1974 book Melancholy (in Polish: "Melancholia"). In order to explain psychological phenomena encountered in humans, he borrowed many concepts from the field of cybernetics which gained popularity in Poland at that time, thanks to the works of Marian Mazur (the father of the Polish school of cybernetics). Kępiński starts with the consideration of most basic organisms and how they are different from inanimate matter. First of all, any organism may be treated as an autonomous but open system, separated from its environment by means of a boundary (skin or cell membrane). As an open system, it is engaged in a continual exchange with its surroundings. That exchange may be regarded as twofold i.e. energetic and informational. For the sake of analysis, one may think of energy metabolism and information metabolism as separate processes. Kępiński postulates that life is sustained if both metabolisms are occurring, and it stops if one of them is ceased.

The energy metabolism concept is relatively easy to understand. The molecules of the body are continually replaced. Catabolic and anabolic processes occur in cells. Information metabolism is the other side of the same process, but it concerns the structural aspect (i.e. how matter and energy are organized) and how control is executed. During energy exchange, the organism strives to maintain its characteristic order (negentropy) and projects that order onto the surroundings. As a result, the order of the surroundings is destroyed. By contrast, inanimate matter does not have the ability to raise or even maintain its negentropy, because spontaneous natural processes are always accompanied by entropy generation.

=== Two biological laws ===
Information metabolism may be generally seen as the exchange of signals between the organism and its environment, but also as the processing of signals originating in the organism. These signals must be interpreted in relation to some goals. For all organisms these goals are predicated on two biological laws: the first law states that an organism must be oriented towards its own survival. The second law states that the preservation of the species is equally important. Kępiński noticed that these objectives are conflicting. The conflict between the two biological laws is often the source of ethical dilemmas. There are times when the organism needs to sacrifice its life in order to save its offspring. Sometimes it is forced to fight with the representatives of its own species, in order to protect itself. The first biological law is egoistic and related with withdrawal from reality (escape, destruction of reality etc.). The second biological law is altruistic and requires turning towards the reality (sexual reproduction requires union with the partner).

In case of humans, the connection between the goals of various everyday actions and two biological laws is less direct, nevertheless these laws still motivate us. Humans are able to project themselves into the future, think abstractly and consciously and therefore their goals may possess transcendent and symbolic character. This fact is typically expressed as belief in a higher good or an afterlife.

=== The hierarchy of value ===
It is impossible to keep track of all information generated by various processes occurring in reality. As organisms strive to fulfill two biological laws, proper selection of signals becomes a central problem. According to Kępiński, a hierarchy of value is necessary in order to integrate information. In humans, that hierarchy comprises three levels i.e. biological, emotional and sociocultural. The first two levels are handled subconsciously. The third level, by contrast, is associated with consciousness. From the biological perspective, the number of processes occurring simultaneously in the organism and its physical surroundings is virtually infinite. There is also infinite number of ways in which these processes may be framed. That complexity must be reduced, as only selected signals may be sensed and processed in the nervous system. Moreover, the signals must be ordered according to their present and future relevance. The structure of the body and locations of various receptors are evolutionally adapted to assure isolation of the most relevant signals from the surrounding environment. The internal structure of the body is adjusted to ensure proper integration of information. Of all signals collected by the receptors, only the most important ones reach the level of subjective experience. At the level of signals reaching the field of subjective experience, attention is actively directed (with the help of emotions) towards those related with two biological laws. Perception is not passive and inclusive, but anticipatory and selective. Above biological and emotional levels of signal interpretation, there is the frame of social and cultural norms of the community, which serves as reference for conscious decisions. The sociocultural background plays significant role in people's lives.

=== Two phases of information metabolism ===
The division of information metabolism into two phases is loosely based on the analysis of the orienting response. Information metabolism is initiated by the perception of a change in the internal or external environment of the organism. In the first phase, the organism seeks to obtain direct information about the perceived phenomenon. Because of that, it must turn its attention 'outside' to the reality. The perceived phenomenon is then subconsciously evaluated. The result of that evaluation manifests itself as an emotion. The sign of the invoked emotion may be positive or negative. This emotion, arising quickly and automatically, serves as the background for the second phase of information metabolism.

In the second phase, the organism executes a locomotor reaction to the phenomenon. Motion towards the source of the stimulus is performed if the stimulus signifies a positive possibility. If the stimulus was evaluated negatively in the first phase, then it is likely that the executed reaction will take the form of escape, fight or immobilization. During the second phase, the organism is primarily occupied by its own actions. It observes their effect and makes adjustments (which forms a feedback loop). Despite the feedback, its connection with reality is less intensive than during the first phase. The separation from reality in the second phase of information metabolism is greater in complex animals and reaches its maximum in humans.

=== Functional structures ===
The term functional structure was used by Kępiński to denote two phenomena. Firstly, the term was used to denote the reaction of an organism to a stimulus. Secondly, it denoted the model of reality generated in the mind in the second phase of the information metabolism. In the case of humans, the number of possible functional structures associated with the first phase of information metabolism is limited. These include, for example, endocrine reactions of the autonomous nervous system and basic locomotor patterns.

The range and complexity of functional structures generated in the second phase is much broader. Humans possess the ability to generate many possible models of reality in response to a newly perceived phenomenon. Functional structures can be relatively complex. They include predictions regarding the behavior of objects in the environment as well as the planned sequence of actions of the individual. Typically, multiple functional structures are generated in the second phase of information metabolism, but only one is embodied (executed). The ones that were generated but rejected, gradually fall into the unconscious and form the Jungian shadow. If particular structure is embodied, the probability of its selection in the future increases. Forgotten structures may manifest themselves in the least expected moment. That situation is known as the possession by the Shadow. Kępiński mentioned that the embodied reaction is a signal to other organisms. It always takes the form of motion (or lack of it). In case of humans, it may be speech (according to Kępiński, speech is the highest form of motion).

=== Emotional coloration ===
Emotional coloration manifests in the first phase of information metabolism. It signifies the general attitude of the organism towards the stimulus. This attitude may be either positive or negative. It depends on the nature of the stimulus and on the physical condition of the organism in the moment of perception. The individual has very little conscious control over the feeling that arises. It is selected at lower levels of neurophysiological operation. Selection of an attitude in the first phase (positive or negative) limits the character of functional structures generated in the second phase. Although typically there are many possible ways of reacting, they are limited by the emotional background appearing in the first phase.

The reality is not static but it always evolves, even though some regularities and laws may be identified. Due to that, the effort associated with organizing the world adequately to our own needs continues through the whole life. It cannot be ceased because of the second law of thermodynamics. In order to decrease its own entropy and the entropy of its immediate surroundings, the organism must expend energy. This is subjectively experienced as the feeling of difficulty, effort or burden. Integrative effort is inherent to life. This effort is rewarded by positive emotional state – the feeling of satisfaction associated with the overcoming of obstacles and advancing towards important goals. By contrast, negative feelings, such as anxiety or fear, signify danger. In case of anxiety, this danger is typically distant in time and space and not known precisely. Fear, on the contrary, signifies close and specified threat to the integrity of the organism.

In healthy individuals, the balance between negative and positive emotions is on the side of the positive. They are more willing to engage in the exchange of information with the environment and to undertake tasks associated with the integrative effort. By contrast, depressive patients withdraw from reality, which lowers their rate of information metabolism. In many cases, the predisposition to depression is caused by the lack of warm and friendly maternal environment during childhood. The presence of friendly and safe maternal environment during childhood is crucial for the development of the general positive attitude towards the environment. If the childhood environment is hostile, the attitude of withdrawal is reinforced and becomes automated.

=== The problem of authority ===
Life may be seen as conflict between two orders – the order of the individual and the order of the environment. As a process placed between these two orders, information metabolism becomes the tool for establishing the right balance of authority ("I am in control" versus "I am controlled"). In pathological cases, the individual may aim to gain absolute control over their environment, or quite contrarily, to fully submit to some external power (i.e. their partner, a political group etc.). The need for an absolute control cannot be fulfilled, therefore it frequently takes the form of fantasy, which sometimes becomes indistinguishable from reality (e.g. in schizophrenia). Many individuals submit to revolutionary movements, promising a utopian future, and to social ideologies which offer simple answers to complex life problems. They give up their individual responsibility to find relief from the burdens of life. In his reflections on information metabolism, Kępiński tried to explain psychological mechanisms which made the atrocities of the Second World War possible.

=== The anatomical basis of information metabolism ===
It is traditionally assumed that functional structures associated with the subjective experience of emotions and moods (the first phase of information metabolism) are controlled by phylogenetically older parts of the brain (diencephalon and rhinencephalon), while those generated in the second phase of information metabolism, subjectively experienced as thoughts, are associated with the neocortex.

=== The mathematical character of information metabolism ===
The mathematical character of information metabolism is twofold. Receptors, acting as inputs for the metabolized signals, operate analogically to analog electronic devices. The processing of signals in the remaining part of the nervous system is binary (the response of a neuron may be twofold: null – no response, or 1 – when the action potential is released). Due to these characteristics, organisms may be considered analogous to digital systems.

== Reception ==
Kępiński's books are regarded as classics of Polish psychiatric and philosophical literature. Because of the interest in his work, his most important books have been reissued several times (recently in 2012–2015 by Wydawnictwo Literackie). Kępiński's work was evaluated by the reviewers as insightful, comprehensive and unique. Nevertheless, his concept of information metabolism has been criticized as controversial by some scholars, since some elements of the theory cannot be verified by the scientific method, with appropriate experiments being difficult to design. In response to these objections, psychiatrist Jacek Bomba pointed out that information metabolism was never meant to be a scientific theory, but rather an anthropological model, which accurately integrates the findings of neurophysiology, psychology, social science, and medicine.

Philosopher Jakub Zawiła-Niedźwiecki noted that current readings of Kępiński must correct for his work largely predating evidence-based medicine as well as the modern era of both philosophy of mind and cognitive psychology. He enlisted two Kępiński propositions that are currently considered incorrect, i.e. the proposition that information metabolism has its control center (the homunculus argument) and the view that only 30% of the brain is used. Nevertheless, as noted by Zawiła-Niedźwiecki, these concepts were not central in Kępiński's theory and can be safely rejected. He also reminded that Kępiński was sceptical about methods that lacked strong scientific basis, e.g. psychoanalysis, and rejected magical thinking in general.

Kępiński stated that his model of information metabolism was incomplete, and the work was interrupted by his illness and death. Some researchers developed his work as part of their own theories. Kokoszka used the conception of information metabolism as the basis of his model of the states of consciousness. Struzik proposed that information metabolism theory may be used as an extension to Brillouin's negentropy principle of information.

Based on Kępiński's work and Jungian typology, Lithuanian economist Augustinavičiūtė proposed her pseudoscientific theory of information metabolism in human mind and society, known as socionics.

== See also ==
- Autopoiesis
- Information
- Negentropy
- Socionics
- Social metabolism
- What is Life?, a 1944 science book
