= Antoni Kępiński =

Polish psychiatrist and philosopher

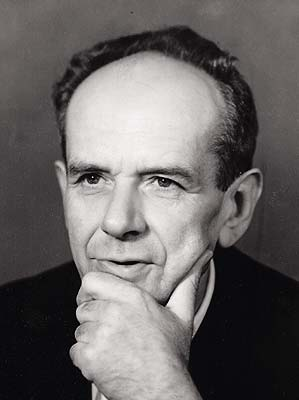
- Antoni Kępiński
- Born: 16 November 1918; Dolina near Stanisławów
- Died: 8 June 1972 (aged 53); Kraków, Poland
- Education: Jagiellonian University; University of Edinburgh
- Known for: Information metabolism, axiological psychiatry
- Awards: Knight's Cross of the Order of Polonia Restituta, Gold Cross of Merit
- Scientific career
- Fields: Psychology, Psychiatry

Antoni Ignacy Tadeusz Kępiński (16 November 1918 – 8 June 1972) was a Polish psychiatrist and philosopher. In his youth he was influenced by Carl Jung's approach. He is known as the originator of concepts like information metabolism (IM) and axiological psychiatry.

== Biography ==
Kępiński was born in Dolina, which at that time was part of Poland (now southwestern Ukraine). During the childhood years, he resided in Nowy Sącz where his father held the position of starosta. He attended the élite Bartłomiej Nowodworski High School in Kraków. In 1936, Kępiński entered the Medical Faculty of the Jagiellonian University. In 1939, he interrupted his studies before graduation and volunteered for the Polish Army to defend his country from the impending Invasion of Poland. After the simultaneous Invasion of Poland by Nazi Germany and the Soviet Union, Kępiński was captured and imprisoned in Hungary, to where he had fled. In 1940, he managed to escape imprisonment and headed to France, then Spain, where he was imprisoned in Miranda de Ebro.

Later he was freed and moved to the United Kingdom, spending a short time with the Polish Air Force in Great Britain. In 1944–1945, he continued his medical studies at University of Edinburgh's Polish School of Medicine, graduating in 1946. He then returned to Poland and took up psychiatry at the Psychiatric Clinic in the Collegium Medicum of the Jagiellonian University in Kraków. Shortly before his death in 1972 he was appointed professor in the faculty.

As a concentration camp inmate himself, Kępiński took part in a rehabilitation programme for survivors from the Auschwitz concentration camp.

== His work ==
=== Auschwitz syndrome ===
Due to his involvement, in the 1950s, in the rehabilitation programme for former concentration camp inmates, Kępiński may be regarded as the pioneer of the PTSD research. The idea of such research originated in the mind of Kępiński's colleague Stanisław Kłodziński. Together with fellow researchers from the Psychiatric Clinic of the Medical Academy in Cracow they examined large number of Auschwitz-Birkenau survivors and mapped out the clinical picture of the concentration camp syndrome which they called the KZ-Syndrome. As noted by psychiatrist Krzysztof Rutkowski, the same syndrome was later investigated in other countries (for example in the United States after the Vietnam War in the 1970s), and is currently known as the post-traumatic stress disorder.

=== The specificity of psychiatric examination ===
Co-workers and biographers of Kępiński emphasize that the key characteristic of his professional activity was his unique approach to the patient, inspired by the philosophy of dialogue. Part of his writings is devoted to peculiarities and subtleties of the psychiatric examination. In his view, diagnosis and therapy should not be based solely on logical analysis, as the inclusion of the emotional dimension is indispensable in psychology. Therefore, the therapist should form an emotional relationship with the patient, based on empathy and trust. The hierarchy in such relationship should be more or less horizontal, as both parties can learn a lot from each other. The general attitude of the therapist should encourage the patient to share experiences, feelings and thoughts without the fear of being judged. In such way, the doctor obtains the chance to better understand the structure and beauty of the inner world of the patient and to establish an appropriate base for the diagnosis. Wearing masks, assuming the position of superiority and being inauthentic during the therapeutic interaction are the most significant mistakes made by therapists.

=== Axiological psychiatry ===
In philosophy, axiology is the theory of value. According to Kępiński, the problem of value is of the greatest importance in psychiatry. It has two dimensions. Firstly, there are certain ethical values which should guide the doctors in their medical practice. Secondly, the therapeutic process in psychiatry should lead to reorganization or rebuilding of the hierarchy of values in the patient.

Kępiński's bioethics were derived directly from The Hippocratic Oath. He restated the widely held view, that the main goal of the psychiatrist is to bring relief to patients. Being a physician is a type of mission or calling rather than an ordinary paid occupation. A key value to be upheld is hope. Without it, the actions undertaken by the doctors can become meaningless. Moreover, patients can sometimes recognise perplexity in the face of their physician. Hence whether improvement is realistic should always guide the medical profession.

Another axiological theme in Kępiński's psychiatry was his view on the nature of psychoses, especially schizophrenia. According to that view, psychosis may be seen as distortions of the hierarchy of values which is one of the key aspects of the information metabolism process occurring in the organism of the patient. He contended that therapeutic work could lead to the formation of a healthy hierarchy of values, allowing the patient to interact with reality in a more balanced manner. His axiological take on psychopathology was seen as something unique and new in Polish psychiatry. It opened the way for new directions of research, such that some reviewers recognised Kępiński's works as the foundation for a new branch of psychiatry.

=== Information metabolism ===
Information metabolism is a psychological theory of interaction between biological organisms and their environment based on information processing. The most detailed description of information metabolism concept was given by Kępiński in his book Melancholy (1974). In this model, the living organism is considered an open system as understood by von Bertalanffy. Living beings are characterized by ability to increase and maintain their own negentropy - an idea popularized in Schrödinger's book What is life?. This ability makes the difference between them and inanimate objects which obey the increase of entropy principle. The body retains the same basic structure, although its building elements (molecules) are replaced quite frequently in anabolic and catabolic processes. The energy derived from food and oxygen is spent on securing the integrity of the organism. To refer to anabolic and catabolic processes in cells Kępiński used the term "energy metabolism". Any activity of an organism is an informational sign to other beings. Activities in the physical realm are reactions to changes perceived in the external or internal reality of the organism. Bearing that in mind, the psyche can be seen as the information-processing unit. As emphasized by Kępiński, psychological structure of an individual remains relatively stable despite an ongoing exchange of information, analogically to the physical structure subject to energy metabolism. In his books, Kępiński explained various mental conditions as disorders and imbalances of the information metabolism in general and its inherent value structure in particular. During his life, Kępiński mentioned that his model of information metabolism is not complete. The work upon it was interrupted by his illness and death.

=== Kępiński as philosopher ===
As a young medic, Kępiński was drawn to the works of Carl Jung and subjected the more "mystical" aspects to a critique which inspired him to launch on his own clinical and philosophical quest. Despite being essentially of a scientific turn of mind, Kępiński's works invoked great interest among Polish philosophers, most notably Józef Tischner, who greatly appreciated his anthropological insights. Kępiński was not afraid of hypothesizing about the most difficult philosophical problems such as the nature of life, the problem of free will, consciousness and human autonomy. On the other hand, he was skeptical about methods and theories which lacked a sufficiently solid scientific basis, e.g. psychoanalysis, and rejected various forms of what he dismissed as "magical thinking" in psychology. Kępiński argued that human ethics are not socially-constructed but rooted in biology and their prerequisites can be found in the animal world. He strongly rejected every form of ideology and extensively commented on the destructive impact of ideologies on human history. Tischner emphasized that many interesting ideas found in Kępiński's works are taken from other thinkers. He recognized information metabolism and axiological psychiatry as two truly original ideas of Kępiński. Kępiński's disciple - psychiatrist Jacek Bomba - noted that the greatest value of his information metabolism theory is its quality of being an accurate and comprehensive synthesis of knowledge from neurophysiology, psychology, social science and medicine.

Kępiński maintained a good relationship with phenomenologist, Roman Ingarden, a prominent disciple of Edmund Husserl. The influence of phenomenology is apparent in his approach to human psychology. It may be regarded as his second favorite analytical tool, next to the scientific approach.

== Bibliography ==
His books:

- Refleksje oświęcimskie (Auschwitz Reflections, 1968)
- Psychopatologia nerwic (Psychopathology of Neuroses, 1972)
- Rytm życia (The Rhythm of Life, 1972)
- Schizofrenia (Schizophrenia, 1972)
- Z psychopatologii życia seksualnego (From the Psychopatology of Sexuality, 1973)
- Melancholia (Melancholy, 1974)
- Psychopatie (Psychopathies, 1977)
- Lęk (Anxiety, 1977)
- Podstawowe zagadnienia współczesnej psychiatrii (Basic Problems of Contemporary Psychiatry, 1978)
- Poznanie chorego (Understanding the Patient, 1978)

Some of the works were translated into Russian, but not English. As a result, his contributions in the field of psychiatry and anthropology are not well known in the English-speaking world. There are some attempts to link Kępiński to postpsychiatry.

== See also ==
- Entropy and life
- Information metabolism
- Aušra Augustinavičiūtė
