= Socionics =

Pseudoscientific personality theory

In psychology and sociology, socionics is a pseudoscientific theory of information processing and personality types. It incorporates Carl Jung's work on Psychological Types with Antoni Kępiński's theory of information metabolism.

In contrast to the generally accepted views in personality psychology on age-related variability of the human psyche, socionics distinguishes 16 psychophysiological types (sociotypes) which it claims go unchanged throughout a person's life. The existence of personality types is extremely controversial in modern personality psychology.

Socionics was developed in the 1970s and 1980s, primarily by the Lithuanian researcher Aušra Augustinavičiūtė. The name "socionics" is derived from the word "society", because Augustinavičiūtė believed that each sociotype has a distinct purpose in society.

The central idea of socionics is that information is intuitively divisible into eight categories, called information elements, which a person's psyche processes using eight psychological functions. Each sociotype has a different correspondence between functions and information elements, which it posits results in different ways of handling information and distinct thinking patterns. One prevalent idea in socionics is the theory of intertype relations, which is based on the interaction of these functions between types.

Independent authors point to the insufficient empirical validity of socionics both in its basis and in its further development, as well as the practical absence of studies on socionics outside the former USSR. The Commission on Pseudoscience of the Russian Academy of Sciences has placed socionics among such well-known pseudosciences as astrology and homeopathy.

== Purpose ==
Socionics provides a means of predicting the character of relations and degree of business compatibility, information sharing and psychological compatibility of people before their joining in one collective group, i.e. to solve the "inverse task" of sociometry.

According to Aleksandr Bukalov and Betty Lou Leaver, socionics uses Jungian typology, informational model of psyche, and theory of information metabolism for political and sociological analysis.

According to J. Horwood, and A. Maw, socionics is a science developed by Augustinavičiūtė in the 1970s. Augustinavičiūtė and her colleagues worked with Carl Jung's personality typologies to develop personality-based relationship profiles. It was found that the nature and development of interpersonal relationships (both professional and personal) are far from random. Instead, they are based on how well suited each individual's psychological profiles are to one another, allowing Augustinavičiūtė to develop 16 'socionic types' predicting and describing the interpersonal relationships between any combination of Jung's personality types.

According to R. Blutner and E. Hochnadel, "socionics is not so much a theory of personalities per se, but much more a theory of type relations providing an analysis of the relationships that arise as a consequence of the interaction of people with different personalities."

Philosopher E. Pletuhina defines socionics as the study about the information interaction of the human psyche with the outside world, between people. She also defines it as the doctrine of psychological types of people and the relationships between them, as well as notes that the particular quality of socionics is that it considers the innate qualities of the human psyche, including the personality type, which cannot be arbitrarily changed without prejudice to the mental and physical health.

Philosopher L. Monastyrsky treats socionics as a pre-science. In his view, the main problem with socionics is the lack of objective criteria for determining a person’s socionic type. The socionic categories were not derived empirically, but speculatively, and have not undergone proper scientific validation.

== History ==
The basic structure of socionics was established in the 1960s and 1970s by Augustinavičiūtė, along with a group of enthusiasts who met in Vilnius, Lithuania. What resulted from their discussions and Augustinavičiūtė's personal investigations was an information model of the psyche and of interpersonal interaction based on Jung's typology but with eight psychic functions rather than four. Augustinavičiūtė's first works on socionics were published between 1978 and 1980.

=== Socionics as an academic discipline ===
Through the work of the International Institute of Socionics and other schools of socionics, there are four scientific peer-reviewed journals (on the practical application of the methods of socionics in management, consulting, psychology, pedagogy, education, psychotherapy, and humanities) and an annual International conference on socionics. The Institute gives "popularization and proliferation of socionic knowledge" as one of its goals.

Svetlana V. Ivanova claims that socionics is taught in more than 150 universities in Russia, Ukraine and other CIS and European Union countries.

Areas of research include educational socionics, sociological socionics, aviation socionics, library socionics, technical socionics, linguistic socionics, penitentiary socionics, and socionics in other subject areas.

Socionics is used in education, not only as a tool for teachers to manage the learning process, but also as a basis for the development and improvement of education and training. Bogdanova claim that a teacher holding socionic knowledge and technologies can consciously collaborate with others and improve professional efficiency. Targeted use of intertype relations helps intensify the didactic process, increase the motivation of students. Socionics is also used to assess the individual psychological and personal qualities to forecast the success of employee career.

Izmailova and Kiseleva found socionics interesting to be applied in advertising and marketing, because it allows you to explain the reasons for the behavior of consumers.

Socionics is a tool for the study of personality and creativity of the writer, the typology of the characters in his works. The method of linguistic-socionic modeling proposed by L. M. Komissarova, used for analysis of individual lexicon of language personality. A translation of socionic characteristics in verbal ones is called the "method of linguistic-socionic modeling" and widely used.

Socionic methods have been proposed for the modeling of information processes in the "human-machine" systems, and practically used to model systems "aircraft operator" in pilots' training, and other similar areas.

Due to the variety of applications of socionics, its concepts and information models, in the 1990s, Bukalov proposed to distinguish socionics of personality, or differential socionics, and generalized, more abstract integral socionics. Bukalov believes that the concept of information metabolism, cybernetic modeling and general systems theory extends beyond of psychology and sociology, and consider the relationship of technical information devices, and the types of information human interactions as operator with various technical and electronic management systems of major industries, including chemical, nuclear power stations, complex computer complexes with adaptive tunable to a specific operator interfaces.

=== Pedagogical socionics ===
The concepts and methods of socionics are used in pedagogy, this collaboration creates a new scientific branch – pedagogical socionics.

Pletuhina noted that the parent, trainer or teacher, who knows the theory of socionics, who also understands an idea of the "image of a socionics type" and who can determine the child's personality type with a sufficient degree of probability can use those opportunities of the individual approaches that socionics provides to raise and educate a child.

The role that socionics takes in the educational process is not limited to being a teacher's tool for the managing process. It is also a base for development and improving the educational system and for preparing staff. Teachers armed with socionics technology can consciously establish relationships with other people and increase efficiency of their pedagogical skills. Rational implementation of intertype relationships can push educational process to become more intensive and increase students' motivation.

Socionics is also researched practical methods and techniques dedicated to evaluation person's individual psychological values to prognoses professional success. Keneva, Marchenko, and Minaev argue that socionics might become a theoretical base for personal-oriented educational technologies.

== Information metabolism elements ==
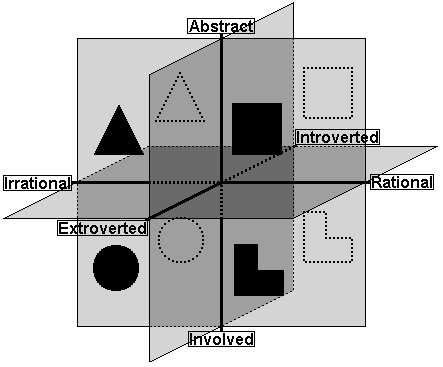

In socionics, Jung's cognitive functions are always either introverted (focused on refining quality) or extroverted (focused on increasing quantity), and are referred to as information metabolism elements (IM Elements). These are said to process information aspects. To understand what an information aspect is, it is necessary to understand information metabolism as Augustinavičiūtė understood it.

Augustinavičiūtė states that the human mind uses eight elements of information metabolism (mental functions) to perceive the world, and each of these eight elements reflect one particular aspect of objective reality. In her works she describes aspects of the world based on physical quantities such as potential and kinetic energy, space, time, and their properties.

Often, other socionists have equated these information elements with their definition and according to fundamental physical concepts as well (Matter-Time-Energy-Space).). Matter is compared to Thinking, Energy to Feeling, Space to Sensing, and Time to Intuition. Given the division of aspects of the absolute between Extroverted ("black") and Introverted ("white"), being four times two, their number is eight.

The 8 socionics symbols were introduced by Augustinavičiūtė while working with Jung's typology and remain the dominant method of denoting the functions and the corresponding information aspects that they process. Text-based notation systems are also used, such as Victor Gulenko's 8 Latin letters ('P' for Pragmatism, 'E' for Emotions, 'F' for Force, 'I' for Ideas, 'L' for Laws, 'R' for Relation, 'S' for Senses, and 'T' for Time, respectively), or Myers-Briggs notation (Te, Fe, Se, Ne, Ti, Fi, Si, and Ni, respectively).

Element	Abstracted definition	Gulenko Name	Symbol	Description
Extroverted Logic	External dynamics of objects	Pragmatism (P)		Judgement of the efficiency of actions and technical processes, the prudence of a method or approach and how it will work practically. P is geared towards facts and assesses situations based on what happened, looking to convey information as accurately as possible, making communication dry and matter-of-fact. In this sense, it is the opposite of Emotions. P approaches systems in terms of how they can be improved, changing and adding to one's knowledge through empirical observation in order to increase functionality and profitability. In this sense, it is the inverse of Laws.
Extroverted Ethics	Internal dynamics of objects	Emotions (E)		Judgement of the infectiousness of expressions and emotional states, the appeal of a message or image and how someone will react emotionally. E is geared towards feelings and assesses situations based on how people feel, looking to convey one's emotions as authentically as possible, making communication exaggerated and charged with passion. In this sense, E is the opposite of Pragmatism. E approaches people in terms of how they are made to feel, provoking and changing people's emotions through expressive actions in order to raise excitement and enthusiasm. In this sense, is the inverse of Relations.
Extroverted Sensation	External statics of objects	Force (F)		Perception of physical objects and the amount of space they take up in the real world, the impact something has on its environment and the threat it poses to other objects. F is geared towards action and decides immediately on quick assessments of superficial, concrete data, making the approach direct and imbued with a harsh determination. In this sense, it is the opposite of Ideas. F approaches reality in terms of the clash of opposing forces, winning over weaker opponents and looking to push a situation to their advantage, even if that requires an intense struggle. In this sense, it is the inverse of Senses.
Extroverted Intuition	Internal statics of objects	Ideas (I)		Perception of abstract concepts and the amount of potential they could hold, the multiple alternatives to any proposition and their latent capabilities. I is geared towards speculation and likes to consider different possibilities, giving unorthodox perspectives a chance, making the approach indirect and roundabout in a whimsical way. In this sense, it is the opposite of Force. I approaches what is possible in terms of expanding its variety, opening new doors and wandering wherever curiosity points next, avoiding any kind of limitation. In this sense, it is the inverse of Time.
Introverted Logic	External statics of fields	Laws (L)		Responsible for understanding logic and structure, categorizations, ordering and priorities, logical analysis and distinctions, logical explanations. L interprets information according to how it fits into a validating system. L is particularly aware of logical consistency and how concepts relate to each other in meaning and structure, independently of particular purposes.
Introverted Ethics	Internal statics of fields	Relations (R)		Responsible for understanding the quality, nature, and appropriate distance of personal relations; makes subjective judgments; and aspires to goodness of character. R has a strong understanding of a person's nature and intentions, one person's feelings towards another, their attitudes of like or dislike, and based on this information, how intimate or distant a relationship should be.
Introverted Sensation	External dynamics of fields	Senses (S)		Responsible for detailed perception of physical sensations; questions of comfort, utility, and pleasure; and a sense of harmony and acclimation with one's environment (especially physical). S understands how well a person or thing's behavior agrees with its nature as well as the differences between comfortable behaviors and positions and uncomfortable ones.
Introverted Intuition	Internal dynamics of fields	Time (T)		Responsible for the imagination of how things will develop over time, a sense of what is meaningful or transcendent and the understanding that some things are inevitable. T understands how causes in the past lead through to outcomes in the future. T is acutely aware of long-term trends and tendencies that are occurring across any single present moment, and sees events as part of a continuous flow. T perceives the possible ramifications of future events and notices ties to the past.

== The 16 types ==
Augustinavičiūtė usually used names like sensory-logical introvert (SLI) to refer to the types. In SLI the leading function is introverted sensation and the creative function is extraverted logic. She also introduced the practice of referring to types by the name of a famous person of the type (although types of these persons are not universally agreed upon, with the old name Napoleon for the SEE being replaced by Caesar after being deemed an inaccurate type assignment). For example, she called the SLI Gabin and the SEI Dumas. Also sometimes names such as Craftsman or Mediator are used to express the social role of the type—a convention introduced by socionist Viktor Gulenko in 1995. Given the formal similarities present between Socionics and the Myers–Briggs Type Indicator (MBTI) abbreviations frequently used in English, some prefer to distinguish socionic type names from Myers–Briggs' names by writing the last letter (J or P) in lower case (for example, ENTp, ESFj)—a practice introduced by Sergei Ganin. This is because the relationship between socionics and Myers–Briggs and Keirseyan types is controversial.

Dmitri Lytov and Marianna Lytova state that "main spheres of application of socionics are almost the same as for the Myers–Briggs Type Theory", and that observed differences in correlation "represent characteristic stereotypes of the socionics and the Keirsey typology. Others state that MBTI and socionics "correlate in roughly 30% of cases," and that "there are many subtle differences". J and P in Socionics and Myers–Briggs are completely different: in Myers–Briggs, J and P stands for the first extraverted function (J—extraverted thinking or feeling, P—extraverted sensing or intuition); in Socionics, J and P stands for the first function (J—rational (thinking and feeling), P—irrational (sensing and intuition)). This formal conversion is carried out in accordance with the Myers–Briggs Type Indicator.

In dividing the socion according to the four Jungian dichotomies, from this is formed 16 socionic types. The following tables provide a list of types with the names most commonly used in socionics:

4-letter type acronym (socionics)	Four functions (Jung)	Model A	Two functions (socionics)	Formal name	Type alias	Social role
ESTj		P1 S2 E3 T4 R5 I6 L7 F8		Logical Sensory Extravert (LSE)	Stierlitz	Administrator / Director
ENTj		P1 T2 E3 S4 R5 F6 L7 I8		Logical Intuitive Extravert (LIE)	Jack London	Enterpriser / Pioneer
ESFj		E1 S2 P3 T4 L5 I6 R7 F8		Ethical Sensory Extravert (ESE)	Hugo	Bonvivant / Enthusiast
ENFj		E1 T2 P3 S4 L5 F6 R7 I8		Ethical Intuitive Extravert (EIE)	Hamlet	Mentor / Actor
ESTp		F1 L2 I3 R4 T5 E6 S7 P8		Sensory Logical Extravert (SLE)	Zhukov	Legionnaire / Conqueror
ESFp		F1 R2 I3 L4 T5 P6 S7 E8		Sensory Ethical Extravert (SEE)	Napoleon	Politician / Ambassador
ENTp		I1 L2 F3 R4 S5 E6 T7 P8		Intuitive Logical Extravert (ILE)	Don Quixote	Seeker / Inventor
ENFp		I1 R2 F3 L4 S5 P6 T7 E8		Intuitive Ethical Extravert (IEE)	Huxley	Psychologist / Reporter
ISTp		S1 P2 T3 E4 I5 R6 F7 L8		Sensory Logical Introvert (SLI)	Gabin	Craftsman / Mechanic
INTp		T1 P2 S3 E4 F5 R6 I7 L8		Intuitive Logical Introvert (ILI)	Balzac	Critic / Mastermind
ISFp		S1 E2 T3 P4 I5 L6 F7 R8		Sensory Ethical Introvert (SEI)	Dumas	Mediator / Peacemaker
INFp		T1 E2 S3 P4 F5 L6 I7 R8		Intuitive Ethical Introvert (IEI)	Yesenin	Lyricist / Romantic
ISTj		L1 F2 R3 I4 E5 T6 P7 S8		Logical Sensory Introvert (LSI)	Maxim Gorky	Inspector / Pragmatist
ISFj		R1 F2 L3 I4 P5 T6 E7 S8		Ethical Sensory Introvert (ESI)	Dreiser	Guardian / Conservator
INTj		L1 I2 R3 F4 E5 S6 P7 T8		Logical Intuitive Introvert (LII)	Robespierre	Analyst / Scientist
INFj		R1 I2 L3 F4 P5 S6 E7 T8		Ethical Intuitive Introvert (EII)	Dostoyevsky	Humanist / Empath

The second concept is the functional dimensions. It was introduced by Aleksandr Bukalov. He defined the first dimension as the personal experience (Ex), the second dimension as social norms (Nr), the third dimension as the current situation (St), and the fourth dimension as the globality, or time perspective (Tm). This concept is useful because it best illustrates the difference in cognitive power (imagine measuring capability of 2D v. 3D measuring tool) and roughly describes abilities of each function to process and generate information. Still, definitions of dimensions require further research and clarification. For example, the vulnerable function tends to lose knowledge which have not been used.

== Criticism ==
Psychophysiologist Sergey Bogomaz says there is no reason for considering socionics as a separate science. He considers socionic typology to be a Russian version of post-Jung typology, similar to the Myers-Briggs typology, but distinguished by a greater number of typological features and the formulation of prerequisites for the study of intertype relationships. Bogomaz considers the construction of the theory of intertype relationships to be an undoubted contribution of Augustinavičiūtė to the development of Jung typology, but criticized it by stating that there is little experimental data in socionics, there is no empirical verification of many claims, and by having many unsystematic pseudoscientific publications.

Philosopher L. M. Monastirsky identified the use of speculative categories as the first shortcoming of socionics. Secondly, he stated that it lacks clearly defined typing method and each socionics school defines methods of their own. At the same time Monastirsky, recognizing the potential of socionics, proposed to turn to the concept of a socionic type for carrying out some research in the field of the methodology of science.

An important issue in the field of socionics is the problem of convergence between type diagnoses of different analysts. Vladimir Ermak showed that ignorance of model A of the type of information metabolism leads to numerous mistakes in the definition of a socionic type. In the early 2000s, socionic analysts tried to develop more rigorous approaches to type diagnosis.

== See also ==
- Analytical psychology
- Jungian Type Index
- Myers–Briggs Type Indicator
- Information metabolism of Antoni Kępiński
