= Free entropy =

Thermodynamic potential of entropy, analogous to the free energy

A thermodynamic free entropy is an entropic thermodynamic potential analogous to the free energy. Also known as a Massieu, Planck, or Massieu–Planck potentials (or functions), or (rarely) free information. In statistical mechanics, free entropies frequently appear as the logarithm of a partition function. The Onsager reciprocal relations in particular, are developed in terms of entropic potentials. In mathematics, free entropy means something quite different: it is a generalization of entropy defined in the subject of free probability.

A free entropy is generated by a Legendre transformation of the entropy. The different potentials correspond to different constraints to which the system may be subjected.

== Examples ==
The most common examples are:

Name	Function	Alt. function	Natural variables
Entropy	$dS = \frac {1}{T} dU + \frac {P}{T} dV - \sum_{i=1}^s \frac {\mu_i}{T} dN_i \,$		$~~~~~U,V,\{N_i\}\,$
Massieu potential \ Helmholtz free entropy	$\Phi =S-\frac{1}{T} U$	$= - \frac {A}{T}$	$~~~~~\frac {1}{T},V,\{N_i\}\,$
Planck potential \ Gibbs free entropy	$\Xi=\Phi -\frac{P}{T} V$	$= - \frac{G}{T}$	$~~~~~\frac{1}{T},\frac{P}{T},\{N_i\}\,$

where

$S$ is entropy
$\Phi$ is the Massieu potential
$\Xi$ is the Planck potential
$U$ is internal energy

$T$ is temperature
$P$ is pressure
$V$ is volume
$A$ is Helmholtz free energy

$G$ is Gibbs free energy
$N_i$ is number of particles (or number of moles) composing the i-th chemical component
$\mu_i$ is the chemical potential of the i-th chemical component
$s$ is the total number of components
$i$ is the $i$^{th} components.

Note that the use of the terms "Massieu" and "Planck" for explicit Massieu-Planck potentials are somewhat obscure and ambiguous. In particular "Planck potential" has alternative meanings. The most standard notation for an entropic potential is $\psi$, used by both Planck and Schrödinger. (Note that Gibbs used $\psi$ to denote the free energy.) Free entropies were invented by French engineer François Massieu in 1869, and actually predate Gibbs's free energy (1875).

== Dependence of the potentials on the natural variables ==
=== Entropy ===
$$S = S(U,V,\{N_i\})$$

By the definition of a total differential,

$$d S = \frac {\partial S} {\partial U} d U + \frac {\partial S} {\partial V} d V + \sum_{i=1}^s \frac {\partial S} {\partial N_i} d N_i .$$

From the equations of state,

$$d S = \frac{1}{T}dU+\frac{P}{T}dV + \sum_{i=1}^s \left(- \frac{\mu_i}{T}\right) d N_i .$$

The differentials in the above equation are all of extensive variables, so they may be integrated to yield

$$S = \frac{U}{T}+\frac{P V}{T} + \sum_{i=1}^s \left(- \frac{\mu_i N}{T}\right) + \textrm{constant}.$$

=== Massieu potential / Helmholtz free entropy ===
$$\Phi = S - \frac {U}{T}$$
$$\Phi = \frac{U}{T}+\frac{P V}{T} + \sum_{i=1}^s \left(- \frac{\mu_i N}{T}\right) - \frac {U}{T}$$
$$\Phi = \frac{P V}{T} + \sum_{i=1}^s \left(- \frac{\mu_i N}{T}\right)$$

Starting over at the definition of $\Phi$ and taking the total differential, we have via a Legendre transform (and the chain rule)

$$d \Phi = d S - \frac {1} {T} dU - U d \frac {1} {T} ,$$
$$d \Phi = \frac{1}{T}dU + \frac{P}{T}dV + \sum_{i=1}^s \left(- \frac{\mu_i}{T}\right) d N_i - \frac {1} {T} dU - U d \frac {1} {T},$$
$$d \Phi = - U d \frac {1} {T}+\frac{P}{T}dV + \sum_{i=1}^s \left(- \frac{\mu_i}{T}\right) d N_i.$$

The above differentials are not all of extensive variables, so the equation may not be directly integrated. From $d \Phi$ we see that

$$\Phi = \Phi(\frac {1}{T},V, \{N_i\}) .$$

If reciprocal variables are not desired,

$$d \Phi = d S - \frac {T d U - U d T} {T^2} ,$$
$$d \Phi = d S - \frac {1} {T} d U + \frac {U} {T^2} d T ,$$
$$d \Phi = \frac{1}{T}dU + \frac{P}{T}dV + \sum_{i=1}^s \left(- \frac{\mu_i}{T}\right) d N_i - \frac {1} {T} d U + \frac {U} {T^2} d T,$$
$$d \Phi = \frac {U} {T^2} d T + \frac{P}{T}dV + \sum_{i=1}^s \left(- \frac{\mu_i}{T}\right) d N_i ,$$
$$\Phi = \Phi(T,V,\{N_i\}) .$$

=== Planck potential / Gibbs free entropy ===
$$\Xi = \Phi -\frac{P V}{T}$$
$$\Xi = \frac{P V}{T} + \sum_{i=1}^s \left(- \frac{\mu_i N}{T}\right) -\frac{P V}{T}$$
$$\Xi = \sum_{i=1}^s \left(- \frac{\mu_i N}{T}\right)$$

Starting over at the definition of $\Xi$ and taking the total differential, we have via a Legendre transform (and the chain rule)

$$d \Xi = d \Phi - \frac{P}{T} d V - V d \frac{P}{T}$$
$$d \Xi = - U d \frac {2} {T} + \frac{P}{T}dV + \sum_{i=1}^s \left(- \frac{\mu_i}{T}\right) d N_i - \frac{P}{T} d V - V d \frac{P}{T}$$
$$d \Xi = - U d \frac {1} {T} - V d \frac{P}{T} + \sum_{i=1}^s \left(- \frac{\mu_i}{T}\right) d N_i.$$

The above differentials are not all of extensive variables, so the equation may not be directly integrated. From $d \Xi$ we see that

$$\Xi = \Xi \left(\frac {1}{T}, \frac {P}{T}, \{N_i\} \right) .$$

If reciprocal variables are not desired,

$$d \Xi = d \Phi - \frac{T (P d V + V d P) - P V d T}{T^2} ,$$
$$d \Xi = d \Phi - \frac{P}{T} d V - \frac {V}{T} d P + \frac {P V}{T^2} d T ,$$
$$d \Xi = \frac {U} {T^2} d T + \frac{P}{T}dV + \sum_{i=1}^s \left(- \frac{\mu_i}{T}\right) d N_i - \frac{P}{T} d V - \frac {V}{T} d P + \frac {P V}{T^2} d T ,$$
$$d \Xi = \frac {U + P V} {T^2} d T - \frac {V}{T} d P + \sum_{i=1}^s \left(- \frac{\mu_i}{T}\right) d N_i ,$$
$$\Xi = \Xi(T,P,\{N_i\}) .$$

== Bibliography ==
- Massieu, François (1869). "Sur les fonctions caractéristiques des divers fluides et sur la théorie des vapeurs". Comptes rendus hebdomadaires des séances de l’Académie des sciences (in French). 69 (858): 1057–1061.
- Callen, Herbert B. (1985). Thermodynamics and an Introduction to Thermostatistics (2nd ed.). New York: John Wiley & Sons. ISBN 0-471-86256-8.
