= Stepchild =

Offspring of one's spouse, but not one's own offspring

A stepchild is the offspring of one's spouse, but not one's own offspring, either biologically or through adoption.

Stepchildren can come into a family in a variety of ways. A stepchild may be the child of one's spouse from a previous relationship, or alternatively, be the result of an adoption, in which case the child would have no biological relationship with either parent. Some also apply the term loosely to non-custodial relationships where “stepparent" can refer to the partner of a parent with whom the child does not live.

Stepchildren play a significant role in the lives of their parents and siblings. In many cases, stepchildren are welcomed into a family and are treated as full members, with the same rights and responsibilities as biological children. However, in some cases, stepchildren may face challenges or difficulties in their relationships with their parents or siblings, and may require additional support and guidance in order to feel fully integrated into the family.

== Demographics ==
Throughout the 20th century, remarriages following divorce gradually increased, and stepparent lost its association with bereavement. A 2011 Pew Research Center survey found more than four in ten American adults have at least one step relative. About one in six children in the United States live in a blended family.

== Family dynamics ==
Boundary ambiguity is much more prevalent in stepfamilies than two-parent families, particularly with nonresident step children. Patricia Papernow's stepfamily cycle research indicates it takes four to seven years for a stepfamily to develop.

== See also ==
- Stepfamily
