= Massieu function =

Concept in thermodynamics

In thermodynamics, the Massieu function (sometimes called Massieu–Gibbs function, Massieu potential, or Gibbs function, or characteristic (state) function in its original terminology), symbol Ψ (Psi), is defined by the following relation:

$$\Psi = \Psi \big( X_1, \dots, X_i, Y_{i+1}, \dots Y_r \big) \,$$

where for every system with degree of freedom r one may choose r variables, e.g. $\big( X_1, \dots, X_i, Y_{i+1}, \dots Y_r \big) ,$ to define a coordinate system, where X and Y are extensive and intensive variables, respectively, and where at least one extensive variable must be within this set in order to define the size of the system. The (r + 1)-th variable, Ψ, is then called the Massieu function.

The Massieu function was introduced in the 1869 paper "On the Characteristic Functions of Various Fluids" by French engineer François Massieu (1832-1896). The name "Gibbs function" is the eponym of American physicist Willard Gibbs (1839-1903), who cited Massieu in his 1876 On the Equilibrium of Heterogeneous Substances. Massieu, as discussed in the first footnote to the abstract of Gibbs' Equilibrium, “appears to have been the first to solve the problem of representing all the properties of a body of invariable composition which are concerned in reversible processes by means of a single function.” Massieu's 1869 paper seems to be the source for the generalized mathematical conception of the energy of a system being equal to summations of the products of pairs of conjugate variables.
