= Marian Mazur =

Polish scientist

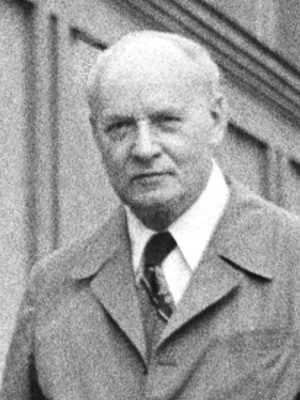
- Marian Mazur in 1978
- Born: 7 December 1909; Radom, Congress Poland
- Died: 21 January 1983 (aged 73); Warsaw, Polish People's Republic
- Resting place: Northern Communal Cemetery
- Scientific career
- Fields: Electrotechnics; Engineering; Cybernetics; Social

Marian Mazur (Polish: [ˈmazur]; December 7, 1909 – January 21, 1983) was a Polish scientist who specialized in electrothermics and cybernetics, and the founding father of the Polish school of cybernetics.

== Scientific work ==
In 1937 Mazur pioneered work on automatic telephone switchboards and developed a working prototype just before World War II. After the war, he established a thermoelectrical laboratory and researched infrared heating. Mazur attained a professorship in 1954 and later worked on standardizing terminology related to electrical engineering and wrote numerous articles and a book on the subject. Mazur was a member of numerous Polish and international scientific organizations, including the 27th Studies Committee of Thermoelectrics of the International Electrotechnical Commission of which he was president. In 1977 Mazur acted as a consultant in the field of artificial intelligence at Rice University.

Mazur's main contributions to the field of cybernetics were the theory of autonomous systems and the qualitative theory of information.

Mazur became interested in subjects related to control theory and what would later be called cybernetics during World War II. He started developing the theory of autonomous systems in 1942, but the destruction of the original manuscript in which he described his theory in the Warsaw Uprising and postwar events delayed the publication of his Cybernetyczna teoria systemów autonomicznych (A Cybernetic Theory of Autonomous Systems) until 1966. Mazur defined an autonomous system as a system capable of controlling its actions and of acting to prevent the loss of this capability, such as a living organism. He also introduced a terminology sufficiently general to describe all such systems and their interactions with their environment.

To describe the flow of information in a general situation Mazur developed a new theory of information. Mazur's qualitative theory of information improved upon previously existing theories by distinguishing between information as such, the amount of information contained in a message, and the information required to identify a message. This theory is described in Jakościowa teoria informacji (A Qualitative Theory of Information).

== Adaptations of Mazur's concepts ==
Mazur's theory of autonomous systems included a formula that described the reactivity of a culture as a ratio of internal reaction to external stimulus where "the value of reactivity is a function of the system's power to transform stimuli into reactions".

In his book Dynamism of Character in Shakespeare's Mature Tragedies literary theorist Piotr Sadowski adapted Mazur's concept of dynamism of character to Shakespeare's characters. In Mazur's theory he defined "character" (being the properties of a system independent of the environment) as "a set of rigid controlling properties of the system".

== Publications ==
- Cybernetyczna teoria układów samodzielnych [A Cybernetic Theory of Autonomous Systems], PWN, Warszawa 1966.
- Cybernetyka a zarządzanie [Cybernetics and management], MSW, Warszawa 1969.
- Jakościowa teoria informacji [A Qualitative Theory of Information], WNT, Warszawa 1970.
- Cybernetyka i charakter [Cybernetics and Character], PIW, Warszawa 1976.
