= Stanisław Kłodziński =

Stanisław Kłodziński (1918–1990) was a Polish physician, lung specialist, and survivor of the Auschwitz concentration camp. He became known for his writing about Auschwitz, and in particular for having co-founded the Zeszyty Oświęcimskie (Auschwitz Journals) in 1961, devoted to discussing the camp.
