= Kissing traditions =

Societal tradition

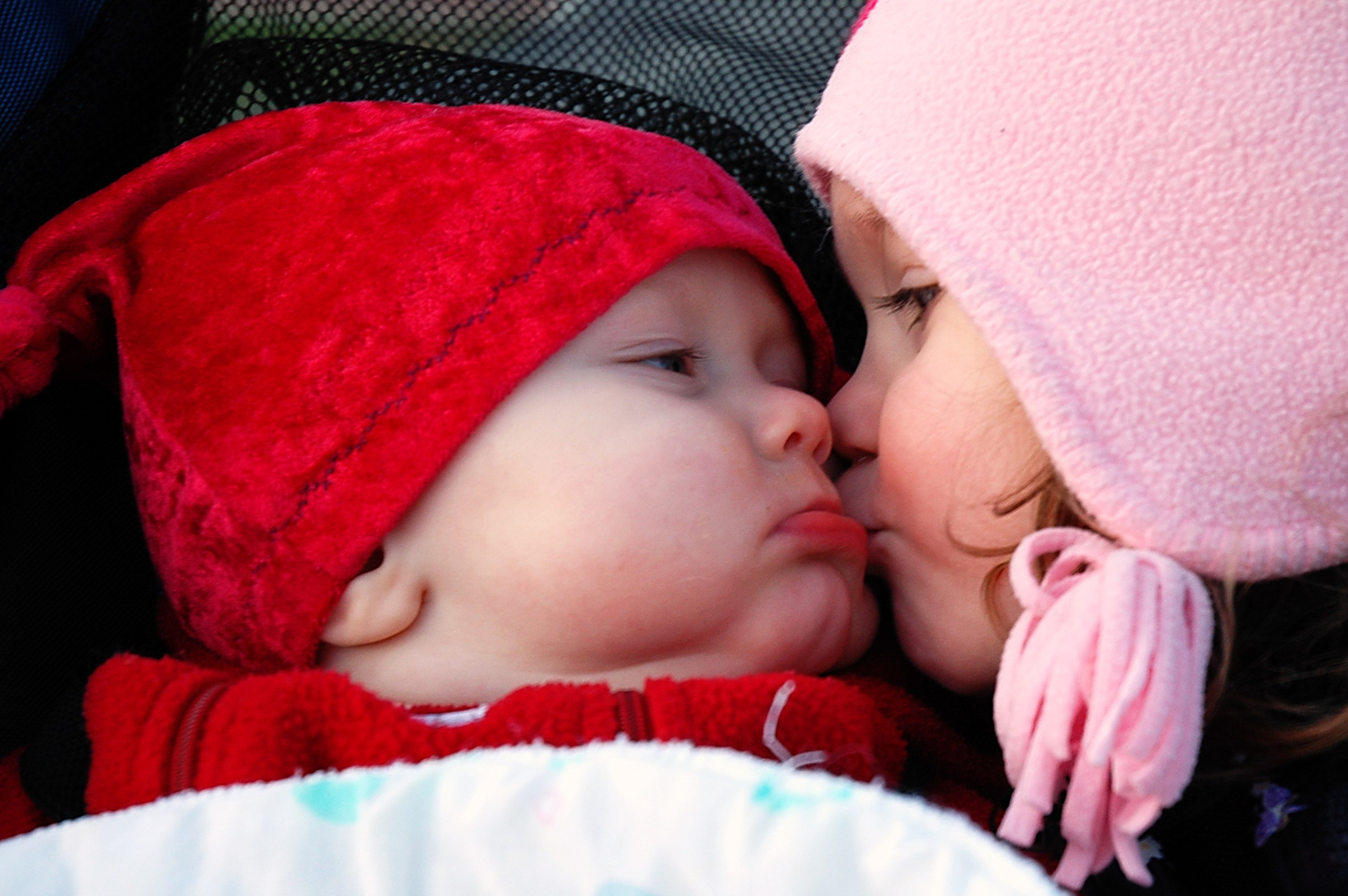
Affectionate kisses

Many societies have traditions which involve kissing. Kissing can indicate joy or be used as part of a greeting. Kissing involves the touching of one's lips to the lips or other body part, such as the cheek, head or hand of another person. Sometimes people often kiss their friends as a way of giving luck or even showing feelings.

== Greetings ==
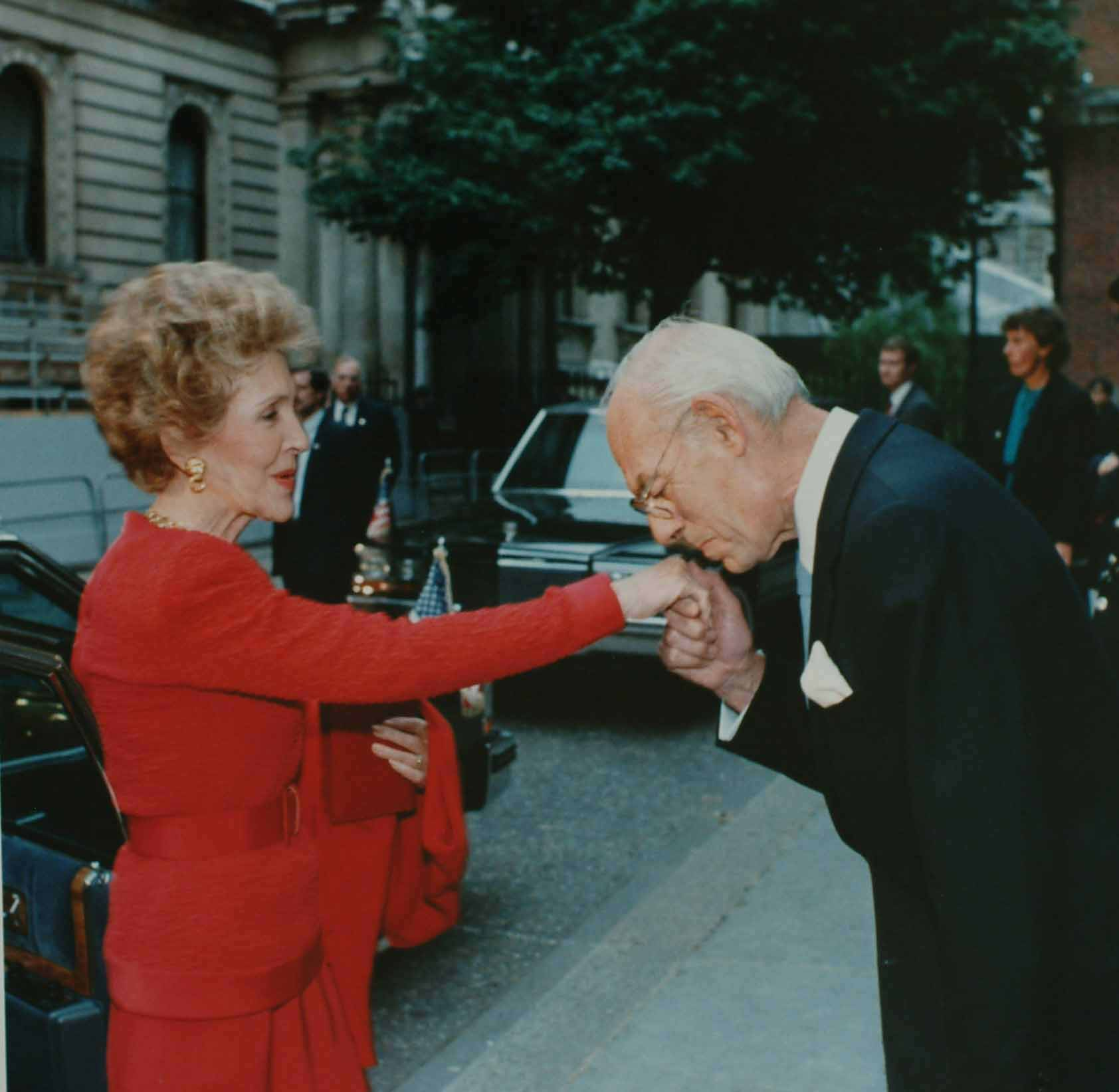
Denis Thatcher, husband of then-Prime Minister of the United Kingdom Margaret Thatcher, greets then-American First Lady Nancy Reagan by kissing her hand, 1988.

In the Western world, a kiss is a common gesture of greeting, and at times a kiss is expected. Throughout all cultures people greet one another as a sign of recognition, affection, friendship and reverence. Depending on the occasion and the culture, a greeting may take the form of a handshake, hug, bow, nod, nose rub, a kiss on the lips with the mouth closed or a kiss or kisses on the cheek. Cheek kissing is most common in Europe and Latin America and has become a standard greeting in Latin Europe.

Kissing traditions were often modified during the COVID-19 pandemic to avoid spreading severe illness.

=== Cheek kissing ===
While cheek kissing is a common greeting in many cultures, each country has a unique way of kissing. In Slovenia, Turkey, Serbia, Ethiopia, North Macedonia, Montenegro, Russia, the Netherlands, Luxembourg, Switzerland, Poland and Lebanon, it is customary to "kiss three times, on alternate cheeks". Italians, Croatians and Hungarians usually kiss twice in a greeting and in Mexico and Belgium only one kiss is necessary. In Ecuador, women kiss on the right cheek only, and in Oman it is not unusual for men to kiss one another on the nose after a handshake.

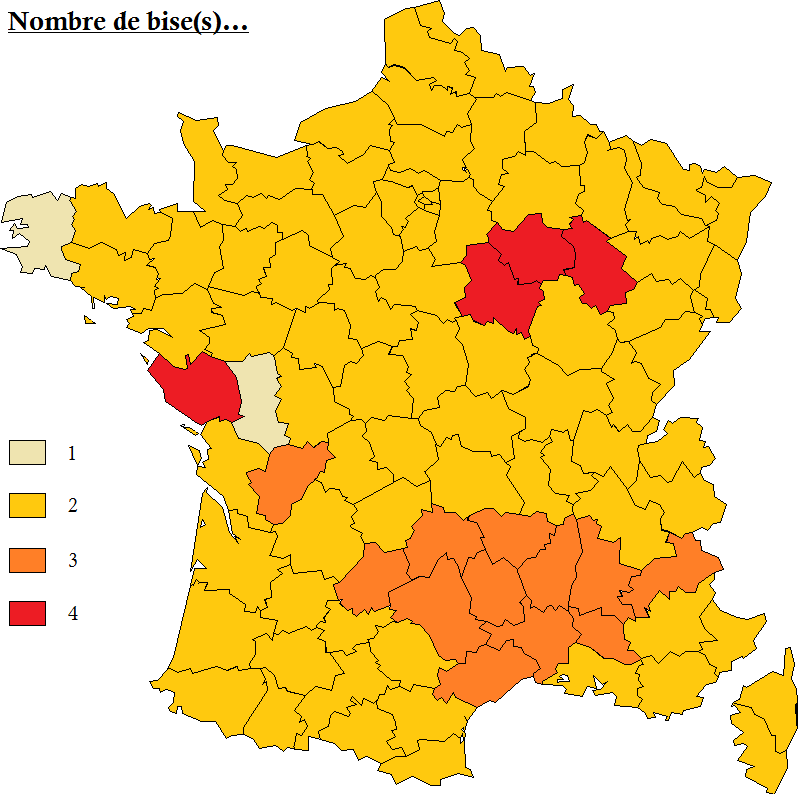
Number of kisses in France

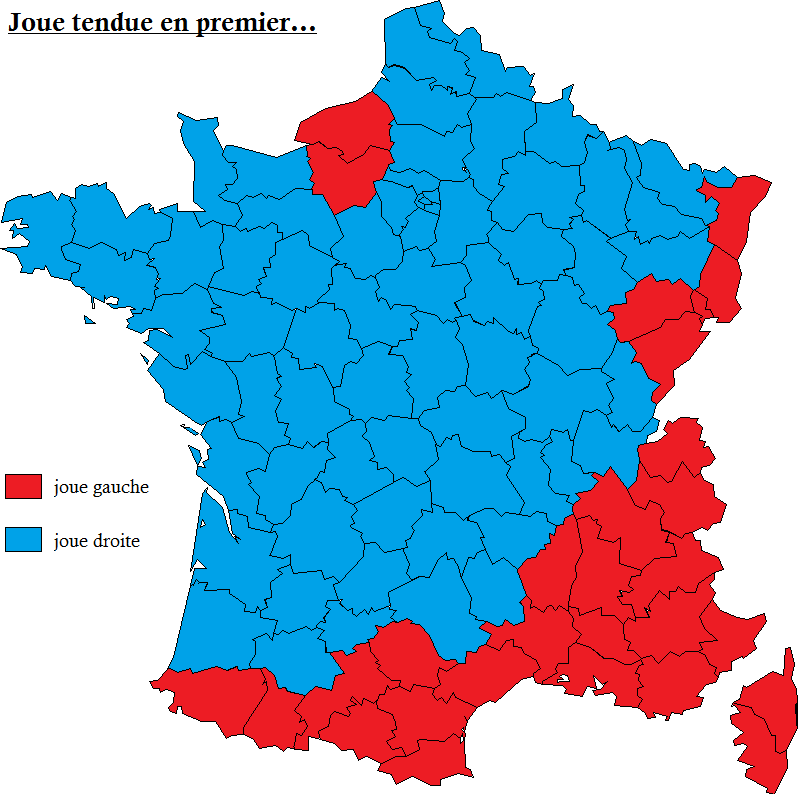
Cheek given for first kiss in France

French culture expects kisses on the cheek in greeting, though the customs differ. Two kisses are most common throughout all of France but, in Provence, three kisses are given and in Nantes, four are exchanged.

== Kissing spots ==
=== Kiss me at the kissing bench ===
The Syracuse University senior class of 1912 left behind a stone bench. With this gesture the graduating class hoped "to begin a tradition of graduating classes leaving behind similar gifts that would add to the beauty of the campus." While the bench does enhance the beauty of the Syracuse University quad, the kissing bench has become much more than an ordinary seat. In the 1950s, it was said that if a woman were kissed while sitting on the bench she would "avoid the risk of becoming a spinster." However, in 1970 the tradition was expanded to state that a woman must be kissed on the bench to graduate and marry. Currently the tradition stands that if two people kiss while sitting on the kissing bench they will eventually marry.

=== Meet me at the kissing post ===
The kissing post, supporting Ellis Island's registry room, is a famous column at which millions of US immigrants reunited with family. At the registry room, final stages of the immigration process were completed. Then, as immigrants moved towards the pillar it marked a significant moment in their journey. Processed immigrants would search for family members who were to meet them at the kissing post. The once ordinary post was named the kissing post by staff members at Ellis Island in reaction to the "joyful reunions" and kisses between relatives and loved ones. Not only did immigrants endure the long passage to the United States but upon arriving they underwent a lengthy inspection process. This emotional process included physical exams, medical detentions, Board hearings for unaccompanied women and children and separation from family members. Seeing the kissing post at the end of their journey to America was an emotional conclusion to their experience. The kissing post signifies freedom, reunion and a new beginning.

=== Kissing the Blarney stone ===
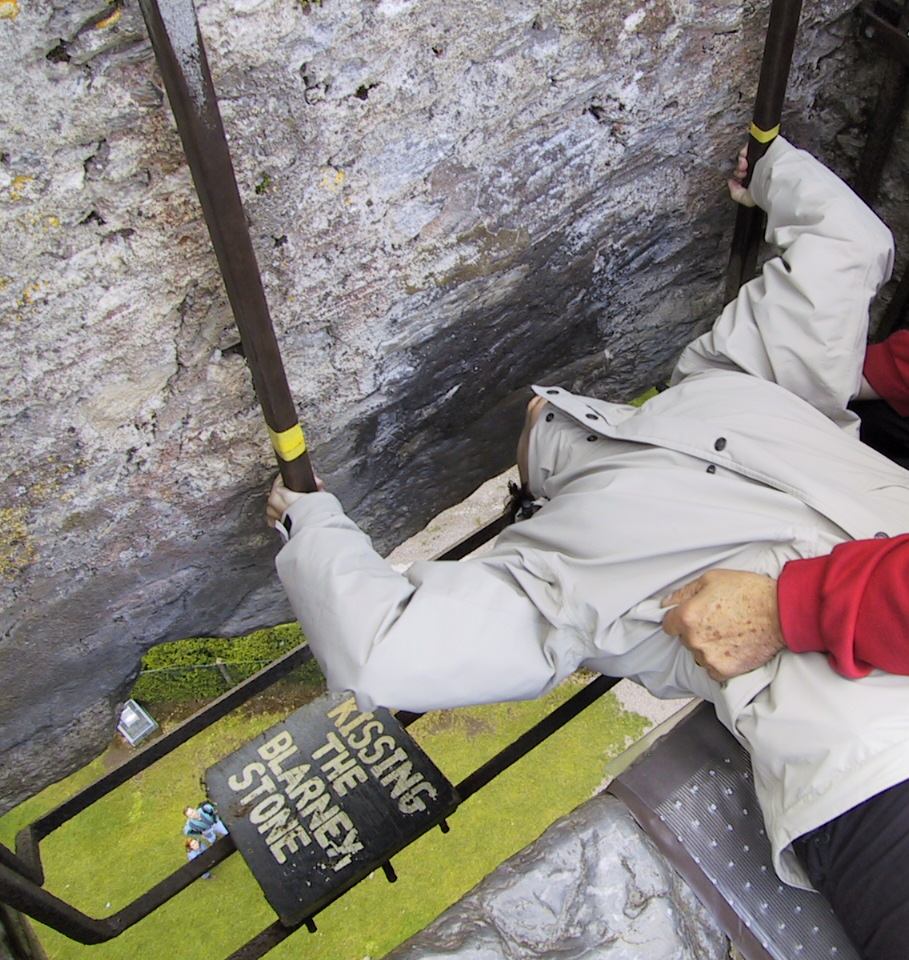
Tourist kissing the Blarney Stone

Kissing the Blarney Stone (also called the Stone of Eloquence) is a popular custom in the Castle of Blarney in Ireland. The stone is below the battlements on the parapet, making kissing the stone difficult. Originally, people would be hung by their feet over the parapet and be lowered to reach the stone. However, after a man died from falling, a new system was developed. The person now lies on their back with someone securing their feet, and they lower themselves downward while holding on to iron rails. Then, they can reach the stone that people have kissed for hundreds of years. How this tradition started is unknown, but people who succeed in kissing the stone are said to be given the gift of eloquence. One legend describes an old woman who was rescued from drowning by the king of Munster. She rewarded him by casting a spell on a stone that would give him magical speaking abilities whenever he kissed it. Another story tells of a past ruler of the castle, Dermont McCarthy, who was noted for never giving up his castle to Queen Elizabeth I. McCarthy was expected to give the castle to the Queen as a sign of his loyalty, however, he always seemed to have an excuse to put it off. He was said to have had convincing and eloquent reasons for postponing his gift, thus the Queen began to call it "Blarney talk". The word Blarney now means "the ability to influence and coax with fair words and soft speech without giving offense". This led to the belief that anyone who kissed the stone would receive McCarthy's skill or the "gift of the gab", as locals call it. Many have traveled to become more eloquent including Sir Walter Scott, world leaders, American presidents, and international entertainers. They all come for this promise: kiss the Blarney Stone, and "you’ll never again be lost for words."

== Special occasions ==
=== Kissing under the mistletoe ===
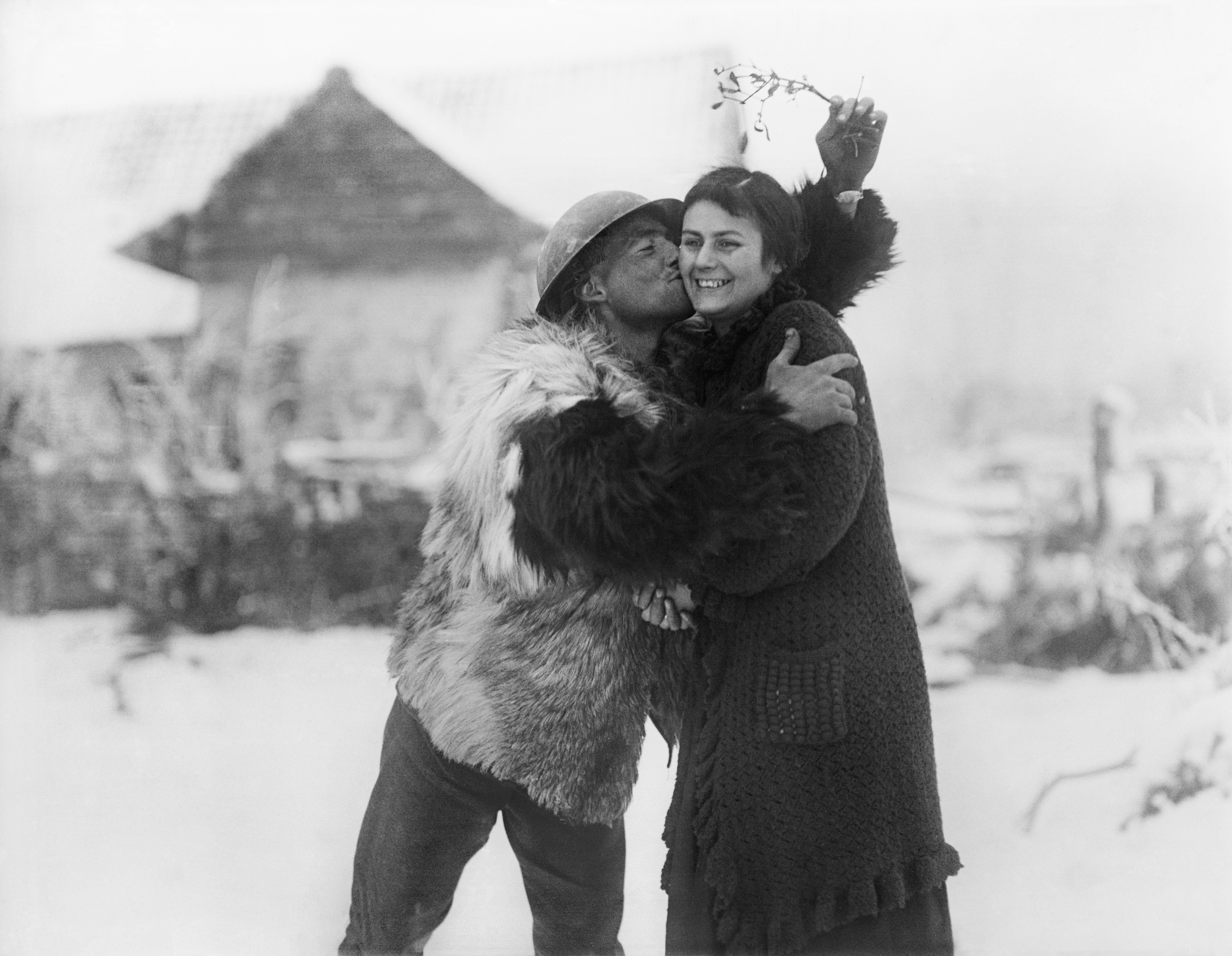
A soldier in a sheepskin coat kissing a French farm-girl under a sprig of mistletoe, near Hesdin, France, 20 December 1917.

It is a Christmas custom for a couple who meet under a mistletoe to kiss. Mistletoe is commonly used as a Christmas decoration, though such use was rarely alluded to until the 18th century. The tradition has spread throughout the English-speaking world but is largely unknown in the rest of Europe. It was described in 1820 by American author Washington Irving in his The Sketch Book of Geoffrey Crayon, Gent.:

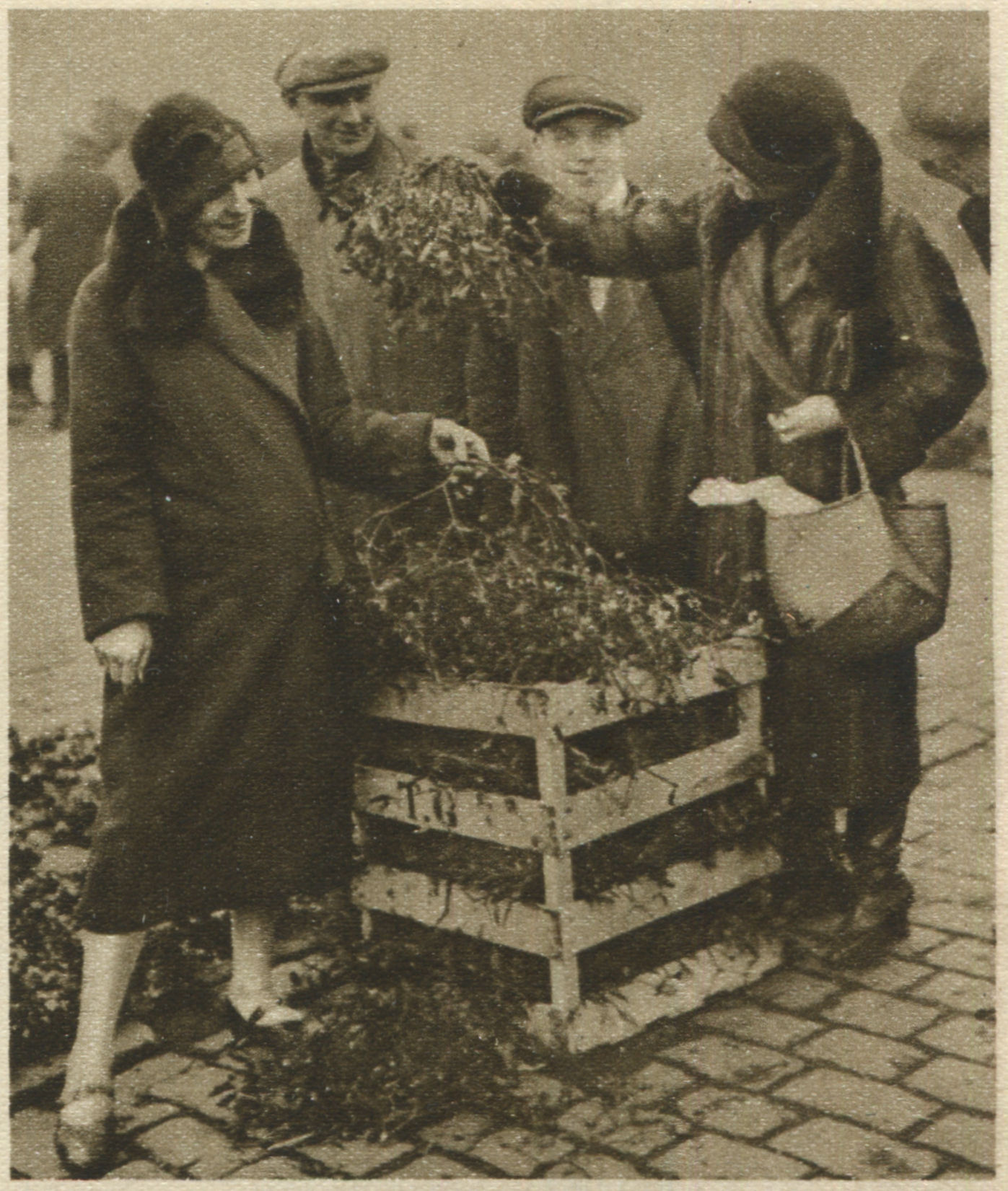
Mistletoe sellers in Caledonian Market, London, 1927

The mistletoe is still hung up in farm-houses and kitchens at Christmas, and the young men have the privilege of kissing the girls under it, plucking each time a berry from the bush. When the berries are all plucked the privilege ceases.

Some claim that the origin of the tradition of kissing under the mistletoe goes back to ancient Norse mythology. According to the myth, a goddess named Frigg had a son named Baldr. When he was born, she made all plants unable to hurt him. Yet she overlooked the mistletoe plant, and a god known for his mischief, Loki, tricked another god into killing Baldr with a spear made of mistletoe. The gods eventually brought Baldr back to life, and Frigg declared that mistletoe would bring love rather than death into the world. People then kissed under the mistletoe to obey the goddess, as well as to remember Baldr's resurrection.

Another theory is that the tradition originated in the ancient Babylonian-Assyrian Empire. Single women apparently stood under mistletoe hung outside the temple for the goddess of beauty and love. They were expected to bond with the first man that approached them - but they did not kiss. Historically, mistletoe was seen as a supernatural, healing plant. It was believed to promote fertility, and its leaves were said to be an aphrodisiac. Mistletoe was once a part of marriage ceremonies for this reason, and was placed under couples' beds for good luck. The tradition later was found in England, when young men would kiss women standing under the mistletoe, and would pluck a berry from the bush after each kiss. After all the berries were gone, it was bad luck to continue kissing under that bush. It is important to remember that during this period a kiss was taken very seriously - it was usually seen as a promise of marriage.

=== New Year's kiss ===
In some Western cultures, it is a custom for people to kiss at the stroke of midnight on New Year's Eve. Some hold the superstition that failing to kiss someone ensures a year of loneliness.

When celebrating at a Scottish Hogmanay party, it is custom to try to give a kiss to everyone in the room after the stroke of midnight "the bells".

=== First kiss ===
The first kiss for a person or between a couple is sometimes considered a significant life event, and this notion may be stressful to people experiencing their first kiss.

=== Wedding kiss ===
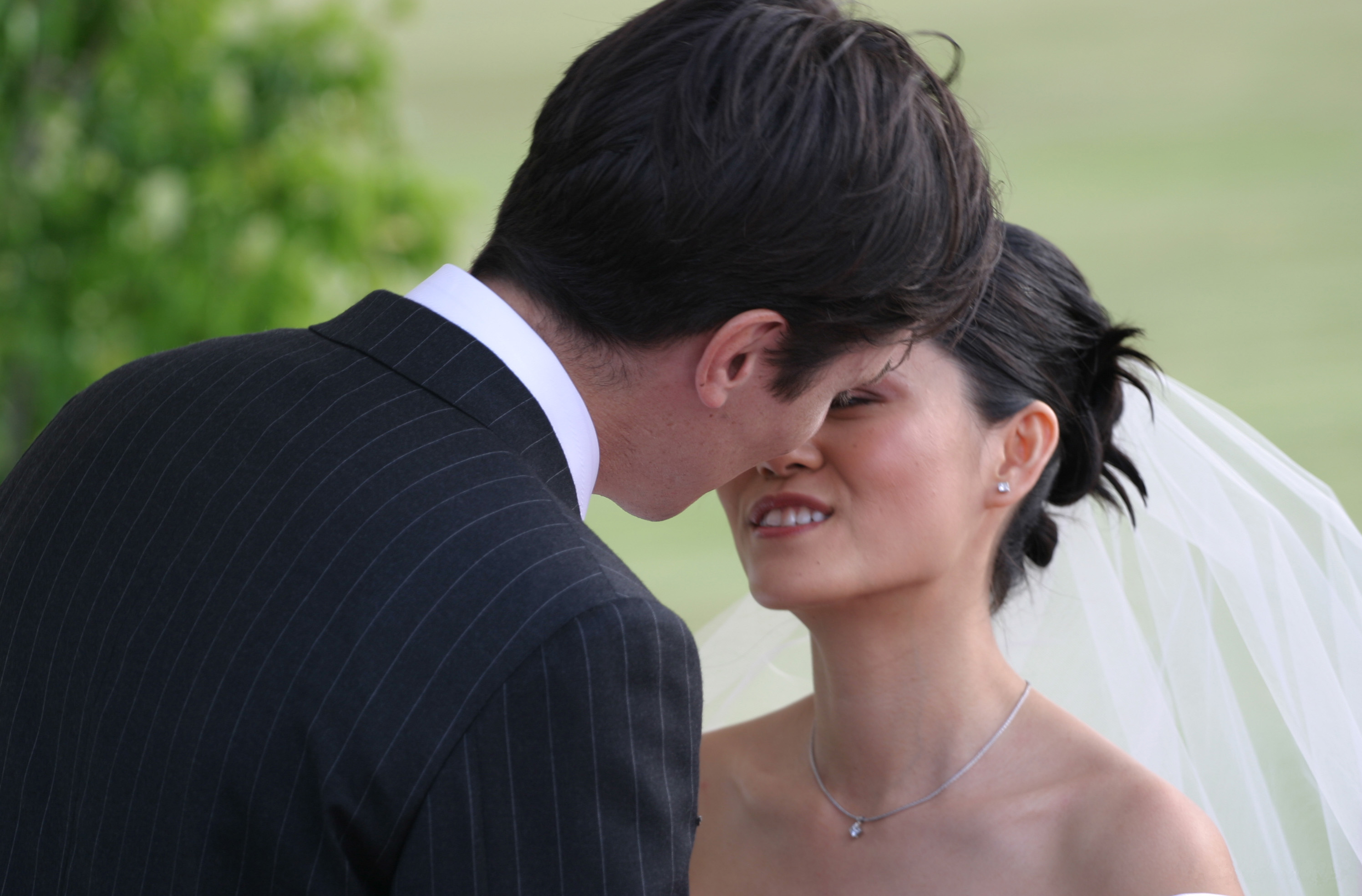
Married couple's first kiss

It is a Western custom for a newly married couple to exchange a kiss at the conclusion of their wedding ceremony. Some Christians hold the belief that the kiss symbolizes the exchange of souls between the bride and the groom, fulfilling the scripture that "the two shall become one flesh". However, some trace the tradition to an ancient Roman tradition, whereby the exchange of a kiss signified the completion of a contract. Although the kiss is not a formal requirement of the ceremony, most regard the gesture as a joyful start of the marriage. The most traditional way guests entice the new couple to kiss is by clinking their glasses. An ancient Christian tradition explains that the clinking sound scares the devil away and the couple kisses in his absence. Another tradition is to ring bells placed at the tables by the wedding party. A ring of the bell signals the bride and groom to kiss.

== Youth and kissing ==
=== Kissing songs ===
In some Western countries, child and teenage culture includes a number of simple songs about kissing, love and romance, with some revolving around heartbreak and others focussing on enduring love. One of the most famous songs in English speaking countries is a children's song often used to tease other children who are thought to feel affection toward each other:

[name] and [name] sitting in a tree

K-I-S-S-I-N-G

First comes love, then comes marriage

Then comes a baby in a baby carriage

Sometimes there are more verses to the song, depending on the particular variation the children know.

== Religious kiss ==
=== Kissing in Christianity ===
Kissing out of honor, respect, and even forgiveness is a tradition that is incorporated into many Christian denominations. The kissing of icons, painted images of Jesus and the saints, is the primary form of veneration in Orthodox Christianity. Veneration of the holy images is an ancient custom dating back to the 5th and 6th centuries, and is still practiced today in Orthodox Christian worship. Through veneration, Orthodox Christians show reverence for the people and the events depicted in the icon.

Another Christian kissing tradition is known as the "kiss of peace." This tradition is traced to Apostle Paul's instruction for Christians to "greet each other with a holy kiss". (Romans 16:16) Today during the "kiss of peace" ritual members will exchange a handshake, hug, or kiss on the cheek as a sign of mutual forgiveness.

Kissing of feet is an important Christian religious ritual. Feet washing, which precedes the kissing, is a sign of humility and is looked upon as an "act of lowly service, of loving service, and of self-giving service." Jesus washed the feet of his disciples and then commanded them to "wash one another's feet" (John 13:12) with love and humbleness as a service through which one can express "the love of God and the saving, cleansing grace of our savior Jesus Christ to each other." After cleansing, a kiss would be bestowed on the feet as an act of servitude. By performing the actions of the lowliest servant, Jesus demonstrated what kind of servant-based leadership was expected from his disciples.

Judas was said to have betrayed Jesus with a kiss - condemning him to death.

=== Kissing the pope's ring ===
Kissing the Ring of the Fisherman (in Italian, the pescatorio) is a centuries-old Roman Catholic tradition. Each newly elected Pope is given a gold ring with his name in raised lettering and the image of St. Peter in a fishing boat. The title Pope (Latin: papa; from Greek: πάππας pappas, a child's word for father) is an informal name for the bishop of Rome, the first of whom was believed to be the apostle Peter, who was known as one of the "fishers of men" (Mark 1:17). Originally the ring was used to seal documents, historically called papal briefs. However, this custom ended in 1842 when the wax seal was replaced by a stamp. Today, Roman Catholics pay respect to the reigning Pope by kneeling before him and kissing his ring.

=== Kissing a bishop's ring ===
Kissing the hand or ring of a bishop (in Italian, the baciamano) is an ancient custom.

== Political ==
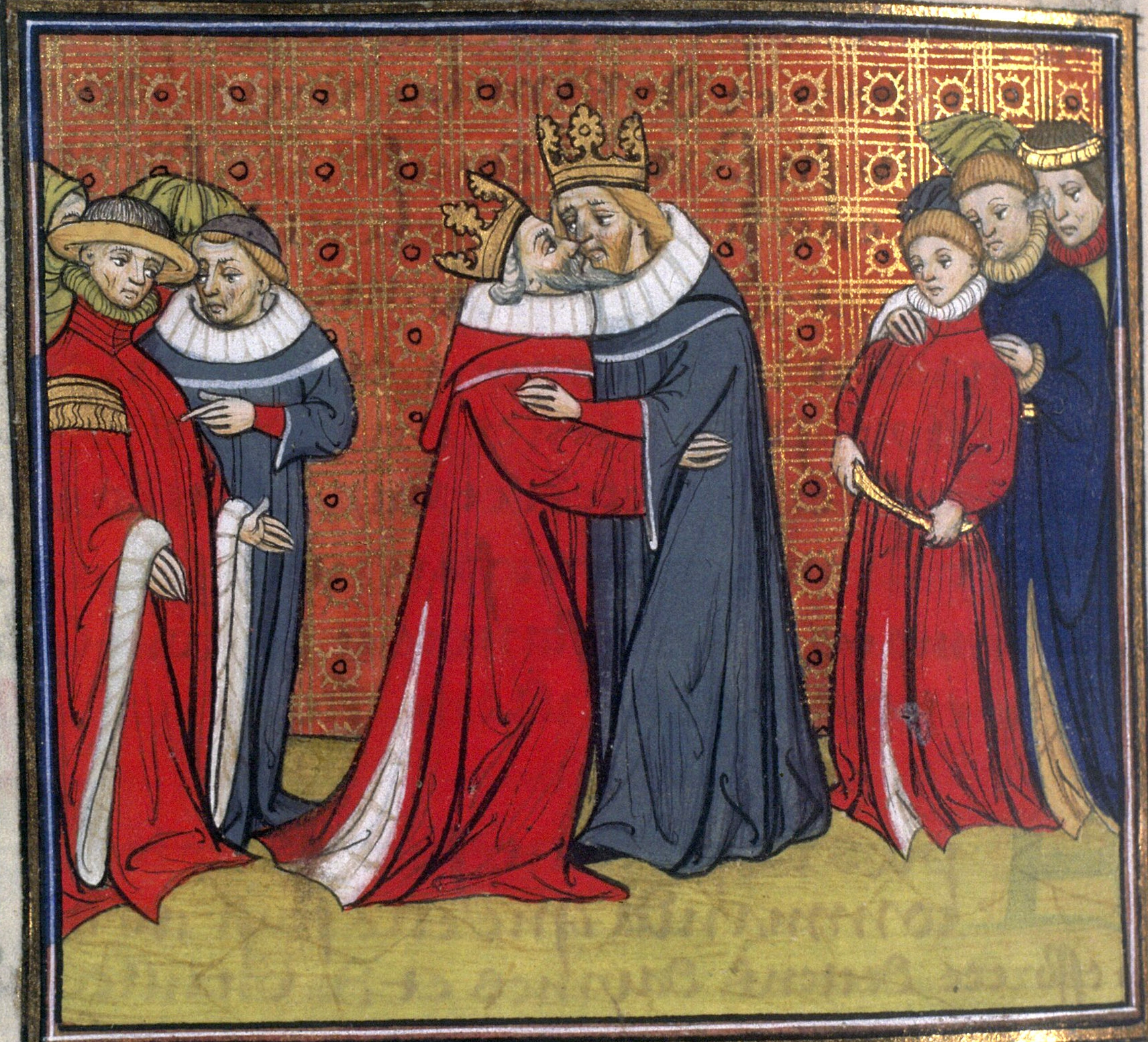
Edward I of England paying feudal homage to Philip IV of France, c. 1293.

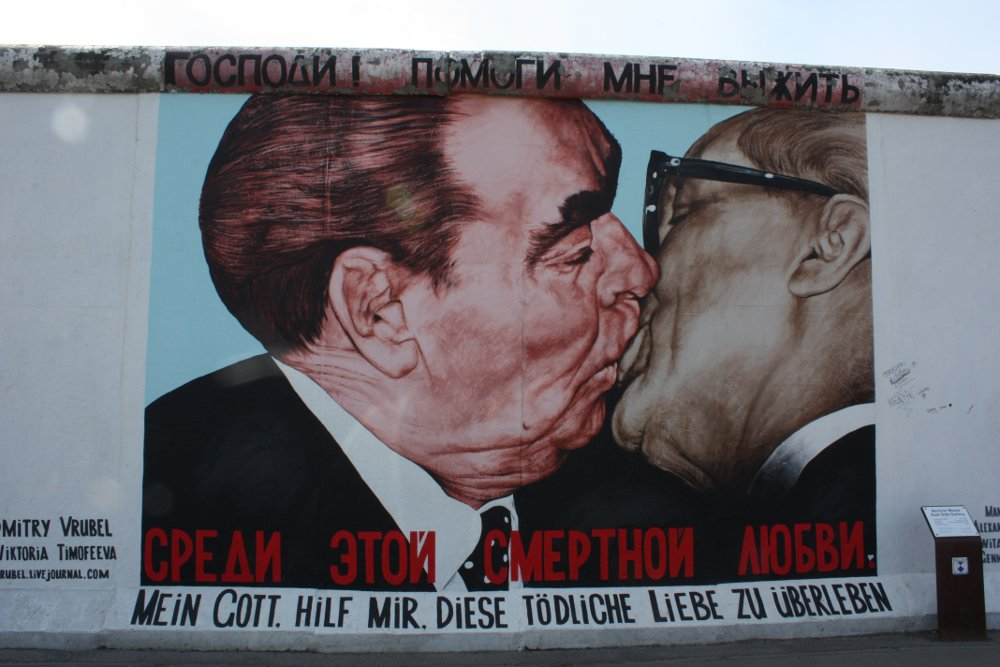
My God, Help Me to Survive This Deadly Love depicting Leonid Brezhnev kissing Erich Honecker in 1979.

== See also ==
- Kiss
- Traditions

== Bibliography ==
- Fillpot, Elise. Ellis Island History "Ellis Island History" 2002. Retrieved 7 May 2007
- Clark, Carol L. PhD "Revisited Ellis Island" 1 July 2001. Retrieved 7 May 2007
- Ellis Island Archives Retrieved 7 May 2007
- ARAMARK. "Ellis Island Museum" Retrieved 7 May 2007
- Galvin, Edward L. "Syracuse University Archives" 2007. Retrieved 7 May 2007
- Syracuse Alumni Magazine Retrieved 7 May 2007
- Syracuse University "About SU: 1906-1930" 2006. Retrieved 7 May 2007
- Mikkelson, Barbara. "New Year's Superstitions" 30 December 2006. Retrieved 9 May 2007
- Blarney Castle: The Home of the Blarney Stone "Welcome!" 2006. Retrieved 9 May 2007
- Gray, Martin. Blarney Stone, Cork, Ireland "Blarney Stone, Cork, Ireland" 2006. Retrieved 9 May 2007
- Cork Guide. "Blarney Ireland" 23 January 2007. Retrieved 9 May 2007
- Religion Facts Retrieved 9 May 2007
- Yans-McLaughlin, Virginia. Kissing Post Retrieved 15 May 2007
- On Kissing Retrieved 15 May 2007
