= Negentropy =

Measure of distance to normality

In information theory and statistics, negative entropy is used as a measure of distance to normality. It is also known as negentropy or syntropy. It is a counter-construct to entropy.

== Etymology ==
The concept and phrase "negative entropy" was introduced by Erwin Schrödinger in his 1944 book What is Life?. Later, the French physicist Léon Brillouin shortened the phrase to néguentropie (transl. negentropy). In 1974, Albert Szent-Györgyi proposed replacing the term negentropy with syntropy (Greek, 'together with change'). That term may have originated in the 1940s with the Italian mathematician Luigi Fantappiè, who tried to construct a unified theory of biology and physics. Buckminster Fuller tried to popularize this usage, but negentropy remains common.

In a note to What is Life?, Schrödinger explained his use of this phrase:

... if I had been catering for them [physicists] alone I should have let the discussion turn on free energy instead. It is the more familiar notion in this context. But this highly technical term seemed linguistically too near to energy for making the average reader alive to the contrast between the two things.

== Information theory ==
In information theory and statistics, negentropy is used as a measure of distance to normality. Out of all probability distributions with a given mean and variance, the Gaussian or normal distribution is the one with the highest entropy. Negentropy measures the difference in entropy between a given distribution and the Gaussian distribution with the same mean and variance. Thus, negentropy is always nonnegative, is invariant by any linear invertible change of coordinates, and vanishes if and only if the signal is Gaussian.

Negentropy is defined as

$$J(Y) = h(Y_G) - h(Y),$$

where $h(Y_G) = \tfrac{1}{2} \log \left(2\pi\mathrm{e} \cdot \sigma^2\right)$ is the differential entropy of a normal distribution $Y_G \sim N(\mu, \sigma^2)$ with the same mean $\mu$ and variance $\sigma^2$ as $Y$, and $h(Y)$ is the differential entropy of $Y$, with $p_Y$ as its probability density function:

$$h(Y) = - \int p_Y(u) \log p_Y(u) \, \mathrm{d}u$$

Negentropy is used in statistics and signal processing. It is related to network entropy, which is used in independent component analysis.

The negentropy of a distribution is equal to the Kullback–Leibler divergence between $Y$ and a Gaussian distribution with the same mean and variance as $Y$ (see Differential entropy § Maximization in the normal distribution for a proof):
$$J(Y)=D_{KL}(Y\ \Vert\ Y_G)$$
In particular, it is always nonnegative (unlike differential entropy, which can be negative).

== Correlation between statistical negentropy and Gibbs free energy ==
Willard Gibbs' 1873 available energy (free energy) graph, which shows a plane perpendicular to the axis of v (volume) and passing through point A, which represents the initial state of the body. MN is the section of the surface of dissipated energy. Qε and Qη are sections of the planes η = 0 and ε = 0, and therefore parallel to the axes of ε (internal energy) and η (entropy) respectively. AD and AE are the energy and entropy of the body in its initial state, AB and AC its available energy (Gibbs energy) and its capacity for entropy (the amount by which the entropy of the body can be increased without changing the energy of the body or increasing its volume) respectively.

There is a physical quantity closely linked to free energy (free enthalpy), with a unit of entropy and isomorphic to negentropy known in statistics and information theory. In 1873, Willard Gibbs created a diagram illustrating the concept of free energy corresponding to free enthalpy. On the diagram one can see the quantity called capacity for entropy. This quantity is the amount of entropy that may be increased without changing an internal energy or increasing its volume. In other words, it is a difference between maximum possible, under assumed conditions, entropy and its actual entropy. It corresponds exactly to the definition of negentropy adopted in statistics and information theory. A similar physical quantity was introduced in 1869 by Massieu for the isothermal process (both quantities differs just with a figure sign) and by then Planck for the isothermal-isobaric process. More recently, the Massieu–Planck thermodynamic potential, known also as free entropy, has been shown to play a great role in the so-called entropic formulation of statistical mechanics, applied among the others in molecular biology and thermodynamic non-equilibrium processes.

$$J = S_\max - S = -\Phi = -k \ln Z\,$$

where:
$S$ is entropy
$J$ is negentropy (Gibbs "capacity for entropy")
$\Phi$ is the Massieu potential
$Z$ is the partition function
$k$ the Boltzmann constant

In particular, mathematically the negentropy (the negative entropy function, in physics interpreted as free entropy) is the convex conjugate of LogSumExp (in physics interpreted as the free energy).

== Brillouin's negentropy principle of information ==
In 1953, Léon Brillouin derived a general equation stating that the changing of an information bit value requires at least $kT\ln 2$ energy. This is the same energy as the work Leó Szilárd's engine produces in the idealistic case. In his book, he further explored this problem concluding that any cause of this bit value change (measurement, decision about a yes/no question, erasure, display, etc.) will require the same amount of energy.

== See also ==
- Exergy
- Free entropy
- Entropy in thermodynamics and information theory
