= François Massieu =

French engineer (1832–1896)

- Born: 4 August 1832
- Died: 5 February 1896 (aged 63)
- Scientific career
- Fields: Thermodynamics
- Thesis: Sur les intégrales algébriques des problèmes de mécanique (1861)

François Jacques Dominique Massieu (4 August 1832 – 5 February 1896) was a French thermodynamics engineer noted for his two 1869 characteristic functions, each of which known as a Massieu function (the first of which sometimes called free entropy), as cited by American engineer Willard Gibbs in his 1876 On the Equilibrium of Heterogeneous Substances.
