= Aušra Augustinavičiūtė =

Lithuanian economist

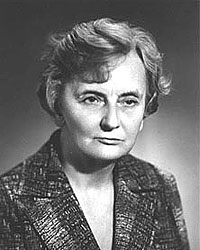
Aušra Augustinavičiūtė, 1964

Aušra Augustinavičiūtė (April 4, 1927 – August 19, 2005) was a Lithuanian psychologist, economist and dean of the Vilnius Pedagogical University's department of family science. She was the founder of socionics, the theory of information processing and personality types.

Augustinavičiūtė was born not far from the city of Kaunas, in Lithuania. In 1956 she graduated from the economic faculty of Vilnius University as a financier. She worked at the Ministry of Finance of Lithuania and later as a teacher of political economics and sociology in different educational institutions in Vilnius.

Her works on socionics, with the exception of few, were not published during the period of Soviet power, but became more and more popular during the 1990s. The current structure of her theory was standardized by Alexander Bukalov, Victor Gulenko, and Gregory Reinin after the founding of the International Institute of Socionics in Kyiv, Ukraine.

The non-governmental organization Russian Academy of Natural Sciences recognized socionics as a discovery and awarded Augustinavičiūtė a diploma and the Pyotr Kapitsa medal in 1995 (not to be confused with the Kapitsa Gold Medal awarded by the Russian Academy of Sciences).
