= Two-factor models of personality =

Psychological factor analysis measurement including behavior and temperament

The two-factor model of personality is a widely used psychological factor analysis measurement of personality, behavior and temperament. It most often consists of a matrix measuring the factor of introversion and extroversion with some form of people versus task orientation.

== Beginnings ==
The Roman physician Galen mapped the four temperaments (sanguine, phlegmatic, choleric and melancholic) to a matrix of hot/cold and dry/wet, taken from the four classical elements. Two of these temperaments, sanguine and choleric, shared a common trait: quickness of response (corresponding to "heat"), while the melancholic and phlegmatic shared the opposite, a longer response (coldness). The melancholic and choleric, however, shared a sustained response (dryness), and the sanguine and phlegmatic shared a short-lived response (wetness). This meant that the choleric and melancholic both would tend to hang on to emotions like anger, and thus appear more serious and critical than the fun-loving sanguine, and the peaceful phlegmatic. However, the choleric would be characterized by quick expressions of anger (like the sanguine, with the difference being that the sanguine cools off); while the melancholic would build up anger slowly, silently, before exploding. Also, the melancholic and sanguine would be sort of "opposites", as the choleric and phlegmatic, since they have opposite traits.

These are the basis of the two factors that would define temperament in the modern theory.

== Development ==
In the last few centuries, various psychologists would begin expressing the four temperaments in terms of pairs of behaviors that were held in common by two temperaments each.

Ivan Pavlov (1849–1936), from his work with dogs, came up with the factors of "passivity" (active or passive) and "extremeness" (extreme response or moderate response). His view of the temperaments in dogs was:

- The Melancholic type (Weak inhibitory): categorized as "weak" dogs;
- Choleric type (Strong excitatory): strong, unbalanced, easily aroused (excitable);
- Sanguine type (Lively): strong, balanced, mobile;
- Phlegmatic type (Calm imperturbable): strong, balanced, sluggish.

This theory would also be extended to humans.

Alfred Adler (1879–1937) measured "activity" (connected with "energy") against "social interest", yielding the four "styles of life":

- Ruling or Dominant type: high activity, low social interest
- Getting or Leaning type: low activity, high social interest
- Avoiding type: low activity, low social interest
- Socially Useful type: high activity, high social interest

These he compared to the choleric, phlegmatic, melancholic and sanguine respectively.

Erich Fromm's (1900–1980) factors were acquiring and assimilating things ("assimilation"), and reacting to people ("socialization"). These two factors form four types of character, which he calls Receptive, Exploitative, Hoarding and Marketing.

Also deserving mention is a single scale invented in the 1940s by Karen Horney (1885–1952). This one dimension measured "movement" towards, against and away from people. This would result in the coping strategies, in which these three "neurotic" patterns would be paired with a fourth, "healthy" one called "movement with people". These would describe behaviors associated with both extroversion and reacting to people, in which people attempt to avoid getting hurt, by either distancing themselves from others or maintaining self-sufficiency and independence on one hand; or approaching others, attempting to control or exploit them, and otherwise gain power and recognition; or "give in" to them to gain acceptance and approval, on the other.

=== Factors integrated into modern instruments ===
As the twentieth century progressed, numerous other instruments were devised measuring not only temperament, but also various individual aspects of personality and behavior, and several began using forms of extroversion and the developing category of people versus task focus as the factors.

In 1928, William Moulton Marston identified four primary emotions, each with an initial feeling tone of either pleasantness or unpleasantness. This led to his viewing people's behavior along two axes, with their attention being either "passive" or "active", depending on the individual's perception of his or her environment as either "favorable" or "antagonistic". By placing the axes at right angles, four quadrants form with each describing a behavioral pattern:

- Dominance, which produces activity in an antagonistic environment; with a feeling of unpleasantness until stimulus is acted upon
- Compliance, which produces passivity in an antagonistic environment; with a feeling of unpleasantness until stimulus is reconciled
- Inducement, which produces activity in a favorable environment; with a feeling of pleasantness increasing as interaction increases
- Submission, which produces passivity in a favorable environment; with a feeling of pleasantness increasing as yielding increases

This would be further developed in the 1970s by John G. Geier into the DiSC assessment System, which grades individual scales of "Dominance", "Influence", "Steadiness", and "Conscientiousness". By now, it would be classified in terms of the two factors; consisting of pairs of Extroverted or "Assertive" aspects (D, I), Introverted or "Passive" aspects (S, C), Task-oriented or "Controlled" aspects (D, C) and social or "Open" aspects (I, S).

The California Psychological Inventory's CPI 260 Instrument also has similar scales, of "Initiates action, Confident in social situations" versus "Focuses on inner life, Values own privacy"; and "Rule-favoring, Likes stability, Agrees with others" versus "Rule-questioning, Has personal value system, Often disagrees with others" and the four "lifestyles": Leader, Supporter, Innovator, and Visualizer.

=== Two-Factors expanded to measure more than four types ===
Galen also had intermediate scales for "balance" between the hot/cold and wet/dry poles, yielding a total of nine temperaments. Four were the original humors, and five were balanced in one or both scales.

Another addition to the two factor models was the creation of a 10 by 10 square grid developed by Robert R. Blake and Jane Mouton in their Managerial Grid Model introduced in 1964. This matrix graded, from 0–9, the factors of "Concern for Production" (X-axis) and "Concern for People" (Y-axis), allowing a moderate range of scores, which yielded five "leadership styles":

- Impoverished (low X, Y)
- Produce or Perish (high X low Y)
- Country Club (low X high Y)
- Team (high X and Y)
- Middle of the Road (moderate X, Y)

The Thomas Kilmann Conflict Mode Instrument (TKI) used a version of this with "Assertiveness" and "Cooperativeness" as the two factors, also leading to a fifth mode:

- Competing, (assertive, uncooperative)
- Avoiding (unassertive, uncooperative)
- Accommodating (unassertive, cooperative)
- Collaborating (assertive, cooperative)
- Compromising (intermediate assertiveness and cooperativeness).

FIRO-B would call the two dimensions Expressed Behavior and Wanted Behavior, and use three separate matrices for the respective areas of Inclusion (social skills) Control (leadership and responsibility-taking) and Affection (deep personal relationships). In 1977, "locator charts" were produced for each area by Dr. Leo Ryan, providing a map of the various scores, following the Managerial Grid model, with unofficial names assigned to different score ranges. They were generally grouped into five main types for each area, in the vein of the Managerial Grid and TKI, except that moderate scores (generally 4, 5) in only one dimension (with the other dimension being high or low) were given separate names, creating nine basic groups for each area (low e/w, low e/high w, low e/moderate w, etc.). In the control area, there is a tenth group created by a further division of the low e/high w range.

This would form the basis of the Five Temperaments theory by Dr. Richard G. and Phyllis Arno, in which the ancient temperaments were mapped to the FIRO-B scales (in all three areas), with Phlegmatic becoming the moderate e/w instead of low e/high w, which was now taken to constitute a fifth temperament called "Supine", which has many of the "introverted and relationship oriented" traits of the other types defined as such, above. (The "Wanted behavior" scale is generally renamed "Responsive behavior"). The moderate scores mixed with high or low are designated "Phlegmatic blends" and divided with 4 being a blend of Phlegmatic with the lower adjacent temperament, and 5 being a blend with the higher adjacent temperament. This results in 13 separate ranges in each area.

== Other factor pairs ==
Other factors devised along the way measured other aspects of personality, mostly cognitive aspects. This would form a second strain of temperament theory, one which enjoys the most popularity today.

Immanuel Kant (1724–1804) defined his typology by a duality of the beautiful and sublime, and concluded it was possible to represent the four temperaments with a square of opposition using the presence or absence of the two attributes. He determined that the phlegmatic type has no interest in either the beautiful or the sublime, so there was an absence of both (sb). The melancholic had a feeling for both (SB), and the sanguine had a predominating feeling for the beautiful (sB), while the choleric, he determined after comparing with the melancholic, lacked a sense of beauty and had only a sense of the sublime (Sb).

Hans Eysenck (1916–1997) was one of the first psychologists to analyze personality differences using a psycho-statistical method (factor analysis), and his research led him to believe that temperament is biologically based. In his book Dimensions of Personality (1947) he paired Extraversion (E), which was "the tendency to enjoy positive events", especially social ones, with Neuroticism (N), which was the tendency to experience negative emotions. By pairing the two dimensions, Eysenck noted how the results were similar to the four ancient temperaments.

- High N, High E = Choleric
- High N, Low E = Melancholy (also called "Melancholic")
- Low N, High E = Sanguine
- Low N, Low E = Phlegmatic

He later added a third dimension, psychoticism, resulting in his "P-E-N" three factor model of personality. This has been correlated with two separate factors developed by the Big Five personality traits (Five Factor Model), called "agreeableness" and "conscientiousness"; the former being similar to the people/task orientation scale elaborated above. Neuroticism in Eysenck's case acted like the people/task-orientation scale (except for being inverted as to which temperaments were "high" or "low"), but was later separated as a distinct factor in the Big Five.

Carl Jung, in the early 20th century, introduced the four factors that would become a part of the later MBTI, and these included extroversion/introversion, sensing and intuition, and thinking/feeling, which would be correlated to Agreeableness, with Judging-Perceiving roughly as Conscientiousness.

Ernst Kretschmer (1888–1964) divided personality into two "constitutional groups": Schizothymic, which contain a "Psychaesthetic proportion" between sensitive and cold poles, and Cyclothymic which contain a "Diathetic" proportion between gay and sad. The Schizoids consist of the Hyperesthetic (sensitive) and Anesthetic (Cold) characters, and the Cycloids consist of the Depressive (or "melancholic") and Hypomanic characters.

David W. Keirsey would make the connection of the two groups with Myers' Sensors and iNtuitors, providing the two factors for his four temperaments. He would rename Sensing to "Observant" or "Concrete", and Intuiting to "Introspection" or "Abstract", and pair it with "Cooperative" versus "Pragmatic" (or "Utilitarian") which would be the "Conscientiousness" scale; to form:

- SP Artisan (Concrete, Pragmatic)
- SJ Guardian (Concrete, Cooperative)
- NT Rational (Abstract, Pragmatic)
- NF Idealist (Abstract, Cooperative)

Keirsey also divided his temperaments by "Role-Informative"/"Role Directive" to form eight "intelligence types"; and finally by E/I, to yield the 16 types of the MBTI. It was when his former student, Berens, paired the latter two factors separately that she yielded here Interaction Styles, discussed above. Keirsey also divided the intelligence types by I/E into "roles of interaction".

The Enneagram of Personality would map its nine types to a matrix, whose scales are "Surface Direction" and "Deep Direction". These are similar to Extroversion and people/task-orientation, but instead of the types being plotted on a scale of 0–9, Horney's original three grades of "towards", "away", and "against" were retained, and now used in both dimensions (graded respectively, as "+", "0" and "-"). This changes the criteria, as the "moderate" (0) grade is considered "away", but this does not necessarily correspond to the moderate extroversion or agreeableness scores of the other instruments.

== Table of theories and instruments neither using scales explicitly nor recognizing a moderate temperament ==
Date	Founder	Low first and second factors	high first factor low second factor	high first and second factors	low first factor, high second factor
c. 400 BC	Hippocrates' four humours Humorism	black bile	yellow bile	blood	phlegm
c. 400 BC	Hippocrates' four humours Humorism	autumn, adulthood, gallbladder, dry/cold	summer, youth, spleen, hot/dry	spring, infancy, liver, wet/hot	winter, old-age, brain/lungs, cold/wet
c. 1025	Avicenna's four primary temperaments	Technically speaking, rheumatism, insomnia, wakefulness, acquired habit, lack of desire for fluids, loss of vigour~deficient energy, high pulse rate, lassitude, sleepiness all appear to belong to a moderate temperament and Avicenna has assigned them rather arbitrary values			
c. 1966	Temperament by LaHaye	Melancholy	Choleric	Sanguine	Phlegmatic
1970s	Herrmann Brain Dominance Instrument	Analytical Thinking	Imaginative Thinking	Interpersonal Thinking	Sequential Thinking
c. 1998	Hartman Personality Profile	Yellow	Blue	Red	White
2014	Erikson's behavior types	Yellow	Blue	Red	Green

== Table of theories and instruments not recognizing a moderate temperament ==
Date	Founder	first factor	second factor	Low first and second factors	high first factor low second factor	high first and second factors	low first factor, high second factor
c. 1900	Alfred Adler's four Styles of Life	"activity"	"social interest"	Avoiding	Ruling or Dominant	Socially Useful	Getting or Leaning
c. 1920	Kretschmer's four characters	Schizothymic (sensitive/cold)	Cyclothymic (gay/sad)	Anesthetic	Hypomanic	Depressive	Hyperesthetic
c. 1928	William Marston and John G. Geier DiSC assessment	Assertive/Passive	Open/Controlled	Conscientiousness	Dominance	Influence	Steadiness
c. 1947	Erich Fromm's four Types of Character	assimilation	socialization	Hoarding	Exploitative	Marketing	Receptive
c. 1948	California Psychological Inventory CPI 260	action, social confidence/inner life, privacy	Rule-favoring/questioning, stability/value system, Agreeable/disagreeable	Visualizer	Leader	Innovator	Supporter
1958 (1970s-80s)	MBTI codes (Socionics)	E/I	Informative/Directive (mapped by David Keirsey) (Socionics alternately maps it to S/N or j/p)	ISTJ, INTJ, ISTP, INTP (IN, Ij)	ESTJ, ENTJ, ESTP, ENTP (EN, Ej)	ESFP, ENFP, ESFJ, ENFJ (ES, Ep)	ISFP, INFP, ISFJ, INFJ (IS, Ip)
c. 1960s	Stuart Atkins LIFO's four Orientations To Life	Planning vs. Doing	Directing vs. Inspiring	Conserving-Holding	Controlling-Taking	Adapting-Dealing	Supporting-Giving
c. 1960s	David Merrill, "Social Styles"	Assertiveness (Ask-Tell)	Responsiveness (Control-Emote)	Analytical	Driving	Expressive	Amiable
1968	Herzberg's motivation-hygiene theory	motivation	hygiene	Reform or fail	Quasi-Indenture	Perfect	Paycheck
c. 1996	Tony Alessandra Personality Styles	Indirect/Direct	Open/Guarded	Thinker	Director	Socializer	Relater
c. 2001	Linda V. Berens' four Interaction Styles	Initiating-Responding	Informing-Directing	Chart the Course	In Charge	Get Things Going	Behind the Scenes
2011	Strategy layer of 16 Personalities	extroversion	Neuroticism	Confident Individualism	Social Engagement	People Mastery	Constant Improvement

== Table of theories and instruments compared to using "Concrete"/Abstract" (Sensing/Intuitive) and "Cooperative"/"Pragmatic" ==
Date (c.)	Author	Artisan temperament	Guardian temperament	Idealist temperament	Rational temperament
590 BC	Ezekiel's four living creatures	lion (bold)	ox (sturdy)	man (spiritual)	eagle (far-seeing)
400 BC	Hippocrates' four humours	cheerful (blood)	somber (black bile)	enthusiastic (yellow bile)	calm (phlegm)
340 BC	Plato's four characters	artistic (iconic)	sensible (pistic)	intuitive (noetic)	reasoning (dianoetic)
325 BC	Aristotle's four sources of happiness	sensual (hedone)	material (propraietari)	ethical (ethikos)	logical (dialogike)
185 AD	Irenaeus' four temperaments	spontaneous	historical	spiritual	scholarly
190, 1900, 1966	Galen's four temperaments, Ivan Pavlov's four temperaments (Alfred Adler's four Styles of Life), Temperament by LaHaye	sanguine (Socially Useful)	melancholic (Avoiding)	choleric (Getting or Leaning)	phlegmatic (Ruling or Dominant)
1550	Paracelsus' four totem spirits	changeable salamanders	industrious gnomes	inspired nymphs	curious sylphs
1800	Kant's four temperaments	Melancholic	Phlegmatic	Sanguine	Choleric
1905	Adickes' four world views	innovative	traditional	doctrinaire	skeptical
1912	Dreikurs'/Adler's four mistaken goals	retaliation	service	recognition	power
1914, 1978, 1988	Spranger's four* value attitudes, Keirsey/Bates four temperaments (old), Keirsey's four temperaments	artistic, Dionysian (artful) > Artisan	economic, Epimethean (dutiful) > Guardian	religious, Apollonian (soulful) > Idealist	theoretic, Promethean (technological) > Rational
1920	Kretschmer's four character styles	(hypo)manic	depressive	oversensitive (hyperesthetic)	insensitive (anesthetic)
1928	William Marston and John G. Geier DiSC assessment	Influence	Conscientiousness	Dominance	Steadiness
1947	Fromm's four orientations (Eysenck's four temperaments)	receptive (Sanguine)	hoarding (Phlegmatic)	marketing (Melancholic)	exploitative (Choleric)
1948	California Psychological Inventory CPI 260	Innovator	Visualizer	Supporter	Leader
1958 (mapped to I/E and T/F by David Keirsey same year, alternately mapped to S/N or j/p by Socionics 1970s-80s)	Myers' Jungian types	SP (sensing perceiving) (EF, ES, Ep)	SJ (sensing judging) (IT, IS, Ij)	NF (intuitive feeling) (IF, IN, Ip)	NT (intuitive thinking) (ET, EN, Ej)
1960s	Stuart Atkins LIFO's four Orientations To Life	Adapting-Dealing	Conserving-Holding	Supporting-Giving	Controlling-Taking
1960s	David Merrill, "Social Styles"	Expressive	Analytical	Amiable	Driving
1996	Tony Alessandra Personality Styles	Socializer	Thinker	Relater	Director
1998 (Erikson's behavior types are a 2014 revision)	Hartman Personality Profile	Red	Yellow	Blue	White > Green
2001	Linda V. Berens' four Interaction Styles	Get Things Going	Chart the Course	Behind the Scenes	In Charge
2004	Gordon-Bull Nexus Model	Gamma	Beta	Delta	Alpha
2023	Brain-Quadrant Unifying Theory of Personality Types and Societal Roles	Right-Front Quadrant, Create/Initiate, Plan Explorers	Left-Front Quadrant, Decide/Direct, People Directors	Right-Rear Quadrant, Relate/Respond, People Helpers	Left-Rear Quadrant, Analyze/Inform, Plan Directors
Keirsey, David (May 1, 1998) [1978]. Please Understand Me II: Temperament, Character, Intelligence (1st ed.). Prometheus Nemesis Book Co. ISBN 1-885705-02-6.
Montgomery, Stephen (2002). People Patterns: A Modern Guide to the Four Temperaments (1st ed.). Archer Publications. p. 20. ISBN 1-885705-03-4.
*Spranger was said to have six value attitudes, but Keirsey cites him as saying that the remaining two, "social" and "political", "pertained to all [men], and hence, were not distinguishing". In fact, "political" was a category containing both theoretic and artistic, and "social" contained economical and religious.

== Table of theories and instruments using Hippocrates' four humours but not recognizing a moderate temperament ==
Date	Founder	first factor	second factor	Low first and second factors	high first factor low second factor	high first and second factors	low first factor, high second factor
c. 190 (1970s)	Galen's four temperaments (i.e. modes of response), Big Five-HEXACO	delay (quick, slow); extroversion	sustain (short, long); Agreeableness	melancholic	choleric	sanguine	phlegmatic
c. 1800 (1947)	Kant's four temperaments (i. e. recognition of the two factors of things), Eysenck's four temperaments	beauty (extroversion)	sublime (Neuroticism)	Phlegmatic	Sanguine	Melancholic	Choleric
c. 1900	Ivan Pavlov's four temperaments	Passivity: (Active or Passive)	Extremeness: (Extreme response or Moderate response)	melancholic (Weak inhibitory)	choleric (Strong excitatory)	sanguine (Lively)	phlegmatic (Calm imperturbable)

== Table of theories and instruments using Hippocrates' four humours ==
Date	Founder	first factor	second factor	Low first and second factors	high first factor low second factor	high first and second factors	low first factor, high second factor	Moderate
c. 1984	The Arno Profile System (Five Temperaments)	Expressive	Responsive	Melancholy	Choleric	Sanguine	Supine	Phlegmatic
c. 1995	Worley Identification Discovery Profile	Demonstrated, Desired	Social, Leadership, Relationship	Melancholy	Choleric	Sanguine	Phlegmatic	Introverted Sanguine

== Classical elements c. 450 BC ==
Introverted, task-oriented	Extroverted, task-oriented	Extroverted, relationship-oriented	Introverted, relationship-oriented	Moderate
earth	fire	air	water	ether

== Table of theories and instruments using extroversion and people-task-orientation ==
Date	Founder	Extroversion scale	People-task orientation scale	Introverted, task-oriented	Extroverted, task-oriented	Extroverted, relationship-oriented	Introverted, relationship-oriented	Moderate
1959	Holland Codes	People vs. Things-Sociability	Data vs. Ideas-Conformity	R-C, CR > RC > R~C	E-S, ES > SE > E~S	S-A, AS > SA > A~S	I-R, IR > RI > I~R	remaining 142 codes
1964	Blake-Mouton Managerial Grid Model	Concern for People	Concern for People/Concern for Productivity	Impoverished	Produce or Perish	Team Type	Country Club	Middle of the Road
1973	Jay Hall Conflict Management	Concern for personal goals	Concern for relationships	Avoid, leave-lose/lose	Compete, control-win/lose	Collaborate, synergy-win/win	Accommodate, yield-lose/win	Compromise-win a bit/lose a bit (neutral/neutral)
1974	Thomas-Kilmann Conflict Modes	Assertiveness	Cooperativeness	Avoid, leave-lose/lose	Compete, control-win/lose	Collaborate, synergy-win/win	Accommodate, yield-lose/win	Compromise-win a bit/lose a bit (neutral/neutral)
2011	Role layer plus Identity aspect of 16 Personalities mapped to Jay Hall Conflict Management and Thomas-Kilmann Conflict Modes	Neuroticism (as correlated to introversion)	High Openness plus Agreeableness/Low Openness plus Conscientiousness	SP-tUrbulent/NT-U v. SP-U/NT-U; I v. I > I v. E > E v. E	SP-U/NT-U v. SP-Assertive/NT-A as SP-A/NT-A, SP-U/NT-U v. SJ-U/NF-U as SJ-U/NF-U; I v. E > I v. I~E v. E	SJ/NF v. SJ/NF, A v. A; E v. E > E v. I > I v. I	SP-U/NT-U v. SP-A/NT-A as SP-U/NT-U, SP-U/NT-U v. SJ-U/NF-U as SP-U/NT-U; I v. E > I v. I~E v. E	A v. U, SP-A/NT-A v. SP-A/NT-A, SJ-U/NF-U v. SJ-U/NF-U

=== William Schutz, Fundamental Interpersonal Relations Orientation-B ===
Score	Inclusion	Control	Affection
Low e and w	Shy; Aloof	Absent-minded; Rebellious	Cold; Defensive
high e and w	Outstanding; Friendly	Authoritarian; Submissive	Empathetic; Needy
High e but low w	Outstanding; Aloof	Authoritarian; Rebellious	Empathetic; Defensive
low e but high w	Shy; Friendly	Absent-minded; Submissive	Cold; Needy
moderate e and w	Social	Democrat	Personal

In 1977, a clinical psychologist who worked with FIRO-B, Dr. Leo Ryan, produced maps of the scores for each area, called "locator charts", and assigned names for all of the score ranges in his Clinical Interpretation of The FIRO-B:

Score	Inclusion	Control	Affection	Temperament by APS (all 3 areas)
Low e and w	The Loner	The Rebel	The Pessimist	Melancholy
moderate e, low w	"Now You See Him, Now You Don't" Tendencies	Self-Confident	"Image of Intimacy" Tendency	Phlegmatic Melancholy / Phlegmatic Choleric
High e, low w	Now You See Him, Now You Don't	Mission Impossible	Image/(Mask) of Intimacy	Choleric
high e, moderate w	The Conversationalist	"Mission Impossible" with Narcissistic Tendencies	Living Up To Expectations	Sanguine Phlegmatic / Choleric Phlegmatic
high e and w	People Gatherer (formerly, "Where are the People?")	Dependent-Independent conflict	The Optimist	Sanguine
moderate e, high w	Hidden Inhibitions	Let's Take a Break	Cautious Lover In Disguise	Phlegmatic Supine / Phlegmatic Sanguine
low e, high w	Inhibited Individual	Openly Dependent Person; (w=6: Loyal Lieutenant)	Cautious Lover	Supine
low e, moderate w	Cautious Expectation	The Checker	Careful Moderation	Supine Phlegmatic / Melancholy Phlegmatic
moderate e and w	Social Flexibility	The Matcher	Warm Individual/The Golden Mean	Phlegmatic

=== Enneagram ===
Deep (long-term) Direction	Surface (short-term) Direction	-/-	-/+	+/+	+/-	0/0	0/-	0/+	-/0	+/0
(- 0 +)	(- 0 +)	Type 8 "Leader"	Type 2 "Helper"	Type 6 "Loyalist"	Type 3 "Motivator"	Type 4 "Individualist"	Type 1 "Reformer"	Type 7 "Enthusiast"	Type 5 "Investigator"	Type 9 "Peacemaker"

== See also ==
- California Psychological Inventory
