= Four temperaments =

Proto-psychological theory

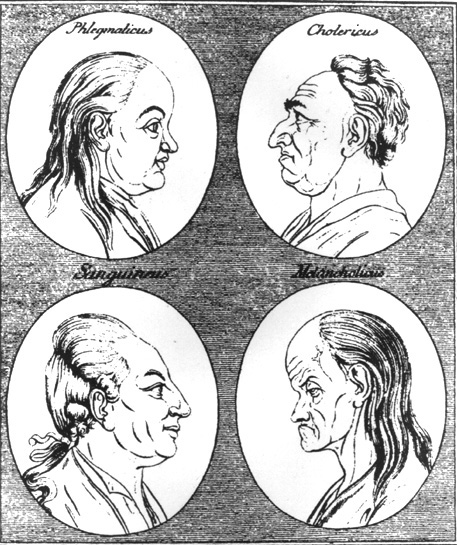
18th-century depiction of the four temperaments. Clockwise from the top left: phlegmatic, choleric, melancholic and sanguine.

The four temperament theory is a proto-psychological theory which suggests that there are four fundamental personality types: sanguine, choleric, melancholic, and phlegmatic. Most formulations include the possibility of mixtures among the types where an individual's personality types overlap and they share two or more temperaments. Greek physician Hippocrates (c. 460 – c. 370 BC) described the four temperaments as part of the ancient medical concept of humourism, which states that four bodily fluids affect human personality traits and behaviours. Modern medical science does not define a fixed relationship between internal secretions and personality, although some psychological personality type systems use categories similar to the Greek temperaments.

The four temperament theory was abandoned after the 1850s.

== History ==
Temperament theory has its roots in the ancient theory of humourism. It may have originated in Mesopotamia, but it was Greek physician Hippocrates (460–370 BC) (and later Galen) who developed it into a medical theory. He believed that certain human moods, emotions, and behaviours were caused by an excess or lack of body fluids (called "humours"), which he classified as blood, yellow bile, black bile, and phlegm, each of which was responsible for different patterns in personalities, as well as how susceptible one was to getting a disease. Galen (AD 129 – c. 200) developed the first typology of temperament in his dissertation De temperamentis, and searched for physiological reasons for different behaviours in humans. He classified them as hot/cold and dry/wet taken from the four elements. There could also be balance between the qualities, yielding a total of nine temperaments. The word "temperament" itself comes from Latin "temperare", "to mix". In the ideal personality, the complementary characteristics were exquisitely balanced among warm-cool and dry-moist. In four less-ideal types, one of the four qualities was dominant over all the others. In the remaining four types, one pair of qualities dominated the complementary pair; for example, warm and moist dominated cool and dry. These last four were the temperamental categories which Galen named "sanguine", "choleric", "melancholic", and "phlegmatic" after the bodily humours. Each was the result of an excess of one of the humours which produced the imbalance in paired qualities.

For example, if a person tends to be too happy or "sanguine", one can assume they have too much blood in proportion to the other humours, and can medically act accordingly. Likewise for being too calm and reserved or "phlegmatic" from too much phlegm; excessively sad or "melancholic" from too much black bile; and too angry or "choleric" from excess yellow bile.

The properties of these humours also corresponded to the four seasons. Thus blood, which was considered hot and wet, corresponded to spring. Yellow bile, considered hot and dry, corresponded to summer. Black bile, cold and dry, corresponded to autumn. And finally, phlegm, cold and wet, corresponded to winter.

These properties were considered the basis of health and disease. This meant that having a balance and good mixture of the humours defined good health, while an imbalance or separation of the humours led to disease. Because the humours corresponded to certain seasons, one way to avoid an imbalance or disease was to change health-related habits depending on the season. Some physicians did this by regulating a patient's diet, while some used remedies such as phlebotomy and purges to get rid of excess blood. Even Galen proposed a theory of the importance of proper digestion in forming healthy blood. The idea was that the two most important factors when digesting are the types of food and the person's body temperature. This meant that if too much heat were involved, then the blood would become "overcooked." This meant that it would contain too much of the yellow bile, and the patient would become feverish. Lack of sufficient heat was believed to result in an excess of phlegm.

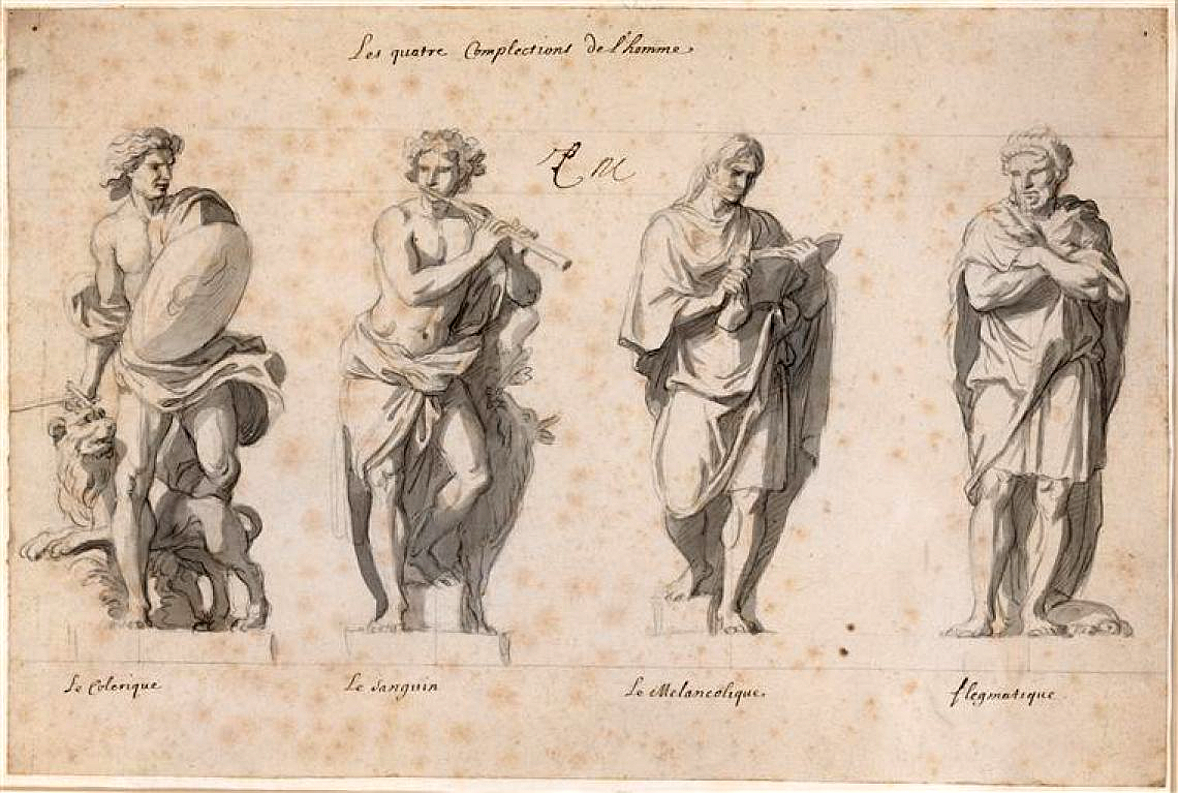
Choleric, sanguine, melancholic, and phlegmatic temperaments: 17c., part of the Grande Commande

Persian polymath Avicenna (980–1037 AD) extended the theory of temperaments in his Canon of Medicine, which was a standard medical text at many medieval universities. He applied them to "emotional aspects, mental capacity, moral attitudes, self-awareness, movements and dreams." Nicholas Culpeper (1616–1654) suggested that the humors acted as governing principles in bodily health, with astrological correspondences, and explained their influence upon physiognomy and personality. He proposed that some people had a single temperament, while others had an admixture of two, a primary and secondary temperament.

Modern medical science has rejected the theories of the four temperaments, though their use persists as a metaphor within certain psychological fields. Immanuel Kant (1724–1804), Erich Adickes (1866–1925), Alfred Adler (1879–1937), Eduard Spranger (1914), Ernst Kretschmer (1920), and Erich Fromm (1947) all theorised on the four temperaments (with different names) and greatly shaped modern theories of temperament. Hans Eysenck (1916–1997) was one of the first psychologists to analyse personality differences using a psycho-statistical method called factor analysis, and his research led him to believe that temperament is biologically based. The factors that he proposed in his book Dimensions of Personality were neuroticism (N), the tendency to experience negative emotions, and extraversion (E), the tendency to enjoy positive events, especially social ones. By pairing the two dimensions, Eysenck noted how the results were similar to the four ancient temperaments.

In the field of physiology, Ivan Pavlov studied on the types and properties of the nervous system, where three main properties were identified: strength, mobility of nervous processes and balance between excitation and inhibition, and derived four types based on these three properties.

Other researchers developed similar systems, many of which did not use the ancient temperament names, and several paired extraversion with a different factor which would determine relationship and task-orientation. Examples are DISC assessment and social styles. One of the most popular today is the Keirsey Temperament Sorter, attributed to the work of David Keirsey, whose four temperaments were based largely on the Greek gods Apollo, Dionysus, Epimetheus, and Prometheus, and were mapped to the 16 types of the Myers–Briggs Type Indicator (MBTI). They were renamed as Artisan (SP), Guardian (SJ), Idealist (NF), and Rational (NT). C.G. Jung's Psychological Types surveys the historical literature of the 'four humors' and related discussions extensively and in depth and proposes a psychoanalytic integration of the material.

Relation of various four temperament theories
Classical	Element	Adler	Riemann	DISC (Different publishers use different names)	Physical manifestation	Source
Melancholic	Earth	Leaning	Depressed	Conscientiousness/Cautious	Black bile	Spleen
Phlegmatic	Water	Avoiding	Schizoid	Steadiness/Supportive	Phlegm	Lungs
Sanguine	Air	Socially Useful	Hysterical	Influence/Inspiring	Blood	Marrow
Choleric	Fire	Ruling	Obsessive	Dominance/Direct	Yellow bile	Liver/Gall Bladder

== The four temperament types ==
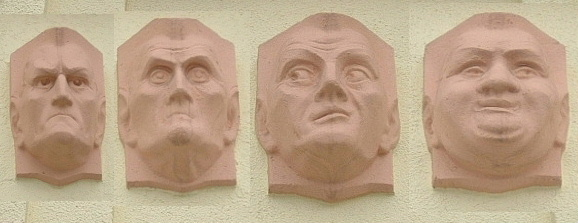
Choleric, melancholic, sanguine and phlegmatic temperaments, 20th-century depiction by an unknown artist

Each of the four types of humors corresponded in ancient times to a different personality type. These were associated with a domination of various biological functions. Lievegoed suggested that the temperaments come to clearest manifestation in childhood, between approximately 6 and 14 years of age, after which they become subordinate (though still influential) factors in personality.

=== Sanguine ===
The sanguine temperament is traditionally associated with air. People with this temperament tend to be lively, sociable, carefree, talkative, and pleasure-seeking. They may be warm-hearted and optimistic. They can make new friends easily, be imaginative and artistic, and often have many ideas. They can be flighty and changeable; thus sanguine personalities may struggle with following tasks all the way through and be chronically late or forgetful.

Pedagogically, they can be best reached through awakening their love for a subject and admiration of people.

=== Choleric ===
The choleric temperament is traditionally associated with fire. People with this temperament tend to be egocentric and extroverted. They may be excitable, impulsive, and restless, with reserves of aggression, energy, and/or passion, and try to instill that in others.

They tend to be task-oriented people and are focused on getting a job done efficiently; their motto is usually "do it now." They can be ambitious, strong-willed and like to be in charge. They can show leadership, are good at planning, and are often practical and solution-oriented. They appreciate receiving respect and esteem for their work.

Pedagogically, they can be best reached through mutual respect and appropriate challenges that recognize their capacities.

=== Melancholic ===
The melancholic temperament is traditionally associated with the element of earth. People with this temperament may appear serious, introverted, cautious or even suspicious. They can become preoccupied with the tragedy and cruelty in the world and are susceptible to depression and moodiness. They may be focused and conscientious. They often prefer to do things themselves, both to meet their own standards and because they are not inherently sociable.

Pedagogically, they can be best met by awakening their sympathy for others.

=== Phlegmatic ===
The phlegmatic temperament is traditionally associated with water. People with this temperament may be inward and private, thoughtful, reasonable, calm, patient, caring, and tolerant. They tend to have a rich inner life, seek a quiet, peaceful atmosphere, and be content with themselves. They tend to be steadfast, consistent in their habits, and thus have steady and faithful friends.

Pedagogically, their interest is often awakened by experiencing others' interest in a subject.

People of this temperament may appear somewhat ponderous or clumsy. Their speech tends to be slow or appear hesitant.

== Modern views, implementations and restatements ==
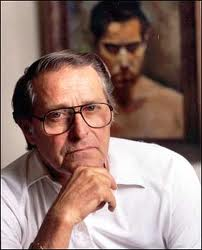
David Keirsey (1921-2013) was a modern psychologist known for his work on temperament theory.

Waldorf education and anthroposophy believe that the temperaments help to understand personality. They also believe that they are useful for education, helping teachers understand how children learn. Christian writer Tim LaHaye has attempted to repopularize the ancient temperaments through his books.

James David Barber developed The Presidential Character, wherein active relates to hot, passive relates to cold, positive relates to moist, and negative relates to dry. If one were to make a Punnett square of these characters, one can find an Active–Positive, Passive–Positive, Active–Negative, or Passive–Negative individual. This diagram was made after an influential study of the U.S. presidency, hence the name.

Robert R. Blake created The Managerial Grid, wherein high concern for production relates to hot, low concern for production relates to cold, high concern for people relates to moist, and low concern for people relates to dry. If one were to make the same Punnett square of these characters, one can find a Team Management, a Country Club Management, a Task Management, or an Ineffective Management individual.

The National Christian Counselors Association of Richard and Phyllis Arno, licensed the FIRO-B instrument in the 1980's, and derived from it a theory of five temperaments, where the classical phlegmatic temperament is deemed to be a neutral temperament, whereas the "relationship-oriented introvert" position traditionally held by the phlegmatic is declared to be a new "fifth temperament" called "Supine" (meaning "lying on the back"). This instrument is used by many Christian ministries

Date (c.)	Author	Choleric temperament	Phlegmatic temperament	Sanguine temperament	Melancholic temperament
2015	Octopus Temperament (Sy Montgomery)	Assertive	Curious	Joyful	Gentle
2014	HUCMI	Controlling	Relational	Experimental	Analytical
2006	Berens	Theorists (NT)	Catalyst (NF)	Improvisor (SP)	Stabilizer (SJ)
1999/2001	Linda V. Berens' four Interaction Styles	In Charge	Chart the Course	Get Things Going	Behind the Scenes
1999	StrengthsFinder	Striving (Executing)	Relating (Relationships)	Impacting (Influencing)	Thinking (Strategic Thinking)
1998 (Erikson's behavior types are a 2014 revision)	Hartman Personality Profile	Red (Leaders; Bold & Brash)	White > Green (Most Selfless; Relaxed, Friendly, & Loyal)	Yellow (Social Butterflies; Creative & Optimistic)	Blue (Keen Minds; Analytical & Detail-oriented)
1996	Tony Alessandra Personality Styles	Director	Relater	Socializer	Thinker
1989	Benziger	Logic & Results	Intuition & Empathy	Vision & Creativity	Process & Routine
1978, 1988	Keirsey/Bates four temperaments (old), Keirsey's four temperaments	Promethean (Technological) > Rational (NT)	Apollonian (Soulful) > Idealist (NF)	Dionysian (Artful) > Artisan (SP)	Epimethean (Dutiful) > Guardian (SJ)
1973/74	Conflict	Competing	Accommodating	Collaborating	Avoiding
1967	Dreikurs' four mistaken goals	Power or Defiance	Revenge or Retaliation	Undue Attention or Service	Inadequacy or Deficiency
1960s	Fritz Riemann	Obsessive	Schizoid	Hysterical	Depressed
1960s	Stuart Atkins LIFO's four Orientations to Life	Controlling-Taking	Supporting-Giving	Adapting-Dealing	Conserving-Holding
1960s	David Merrill, "Social Styles"	Driving	Amiable	Expressive	Analytical
1958	Myers' Jungian types	Thinking (T); "Logical & Ingenious"	Feeling (F); "Sympathetic & Friendly"	Perceiving (P); "Enthusiastic & Insightful"	Judging (J); "Practical & Matter of Fact"
1948, 1957, 1987	California Psychological Inventory CPI 260	Leader/Implementer (Alphas)	Supporter (Betas)	Innovator (Gammas)	Visualizer (Deltas)
1947	Eysenck	High Extraversion, High Neuroticism (Unstable-Extraverted)	Low Extraversion, Low Neuroticism (Stable-Introverted)	High Extraversion, Low Neuroticism (Stable-Extraverted)	Low Extraversion, High Neuroticism (Unstable-Introverted)
1947	Fromm's four orientations	Exploitative (Taking)	Receptive (Accepting)	Marketing (Exchanging)	Hoarding (Preserving)
1935, 1966	Alfred Adler's four Styles of Life, Temperament by LaHaye	Ruling/Dominant (Choleric)	Getting/Leaning (Phlegmatic)	Socially Useful (Sanguine)	Avoiding (melancholic)
1928, 1970s	William Marston and John G. Geier DiSC assessment	Dominance (D); Red	Steadiness (S); Blue	Influence (I); Green	Conscientiousness (C); Yellow
1921	Jung	Intuition	Feeling	Sensation	Thinking
1920s	Pavlov	Angry Dogs (High Excitation, Low Inhibition)	"Accepting" Dogs (fell asleep) (Low Excitation, High Inhibition)	High-spirited Dogs (High Excitation, High Inhibition)	"Weak" Dogs (whiny) (Low Excitation, Low Inhibition)
1920	Kretschmer's four character styles	Hyperesthetic (oversensitive)	Anesthetic (insensitive)	Hypomanic	Depressive
1914	Spranger's four* value attitudes	Economic/Political	Religious/Social	Aesthetic	Theoretical
1905	Adickes' four world views	Traditional	Agnostic (Skeptical)	Innovative	Dogmatic (Doctrinaire)
1894	Sasang	So-Yang (SY; Little Yang); Active (Unstable & Active)	Tae-Eum (TE; Big Yin); Organized (Stable & Passive)	Tae-Yang (TY; Big Yang); Originative (Stable & Active)	So-Eum (SE; Little Yin); Conservative (Unstable & Passive)
1798	Kant's four temperaments	Energetic & Emotional (Choleric)	Weak & Balanced (Phlegmatic)	Energetic & Balanced (Sanguine)	Weak & Emotional (Melancholic)
1550	Paracelsus' four elemental spirits	Salamanders	Nymphs/Undines	Sylphs	Gnomes
185 AD	Irenaeus' four temperaments	Historical	Spiritual	Spontaneous	Scholarly
325 BC	Aristotle's four sources of happiness	Propraieteri (Acquiring Assets)	Ethikos (Moral Value)	Hedone (Sensual Pleasure)	Dialogike (Logical Investigation)
325 BC	Aristotle's social order	Pistic (Common sense & Care-taking)	Noetic (Intuitive, Sensibility, Morality)	Iconic (Artistic & Art-making)	Dianoetic (Reasoning & Logical Investigator)
340 BC	Plato's four characters	Sensible	Intuitive	Artistic	Reasoning
307 BC	Hippocrates' four humours	Yellow Bile (Hot and Dry)	Phlegm (Cold and Wet)	Blood (Hot and Wet)	Black Bile (Cold and Dry)
450 BC	Empedocles	Fire (Zeus)	Water (Pluto/Nestis)	Air (Hera)	Earth (Persephone/Aidoneus)
590 BC	Ezekiel's four living creatures	Man (Spiritual)	Eagle (Far-seeing)	Lion (Bold)	Ox (Sturdy)
Adapted and modified from: Montgomery, Stephen (2002). People Patterns: A Modern Guide to the Four Temperaments. Archer Publications. p. 20. ISBN 1-885705-03-4.; Keirsey, David (1998) [1978]. Please Understand Me II: Temperament, Character, Intelligence. Prometheus Nemesis Book Co. ISBN 1-885705-02-6.

== Usage ==
The 18th-century classical composer Carl Philipp Emanuel Bach composed a trio sonata in C minor known as Sanguineus et Melancholicus (Wq 161/1). In the 20th century, Carl Nielsen's Symphony No. 2 (Op.16) is subtitled "The Four Temperaments", each of the four movements being inspired by a sketch of a particular temperament. Paul Hindemith's Theme and Four Variations for string orchestra and piano is also known as The Four Temperaments: although originally conceived as a ballet for Léonide Massine, the score was ultimately completed as a commission for George Balanchine, who subsequently choreographed it as a neoclassical ballet, using the theory of the temperaments as a point of departure.

The 19th-century French author Émile Zola used the four temperaments as a basis for his novel Thérèse Raquin.

== See also ==
- Big Five personality traits – Personality model consisting of five broad dimensions
- Blood type personality theory – Pseudoscience linking character and blood type
- Enneagram of Personality – Model of the human psyche used as a personality typology
- Four sons of Horus – Ancient Egyptian gods
- Fundamental interpersonal relations orientation – W. Schutz's social behavior theory
- Two-factor models of personality – Psychological factor analysis measurement including behavior and temperament
- Table of similar systems of comparison of temperaments
- Humorism – The theory of the four humours
- Intermittent explosive disorder - DSM-5 diagnosis of a person with severe choleric traits
