= Pum (disambiguation) =

Pum is a town in Kyrgyzstan.

Pum or PUM may also refer to:

- Mariateguist Unified Party (Spanish: Partido Unificado Mariateguista), a political party in Peru
- Philipps University of Marburg in Marburg, Hesse, Germany
- Please Understand Me, acronym
- Pomeranian Medical University in Szczecin (Polish: Pomorski Uniwersytet Medyczny w Szczecinie) in Szczecin, Poland
- Potentially Unwanted Modification (PUM), a classification of malware, for example PUM.bad.proxy
- Public utility model, an emergency medical service system
- Puma language, by ISO 639-3 code

== People ==
- Reinhold Pum, badminton player in the 1968 European Badminton Championships

== See also ==
- Potentially unwanted program (PUP)
