= Interpersonal compatibility =

Ease and comfort of communication between individuals

Interpersonal compatibility or interpersonal matching is the ease and comfort of communication between two or more individuals.

== Existing concepts ==
Although various concepts of interpersonal compatibility have existed from ancient times (see, e.g., Plato's Lysis), no general theory of interpersonal compatibility has been proposed in psychology. Existing concepts are contradictory in many details, beginning with the central point—whether compatibility is caused by matching psychological parameters or by their complementarity. At the same time, the idea of interpersonal compatibility is analyzed in non-scientific fields (see, e.g., Astrological compatibility).

Among existing psychological tools for studying and/or measuring interpersonal compatibility, the following are noteworthy:

- A test of interpersonal compatibility proposed by Timothy Leary
- A three-factor hypothesis (inclusion, control, and affection/openness) by William Schutz (further developed into FIRO-B questionnaire)
- Hans Jurgen Eysenck's hypothesis on compatibility between temperaments
- Social psychological research on similarity of interests and attitudes
- Compatibility test pamphlets of the 1930s and early computer dating of the 1950s, developed by George W. Crane
- Hypothesis of compatibility between personality attitudes by Russell Ackoff and Frederick Edmund Emery,
- DMO tool by Lyudmila Sobchik (DMO stands for Interpersonal relations diagnostics, Russian: диагностика межличностных отношений)

Other hypotheses of intertype relationships were later proposed by adherents of MBTI (D. Keirsey's hypothesis of compatibility between Keirsey temperaments).

== MHC and sexual mating ==
It has been suggested that the major histocompatibility complex (MHC) plays a role in the selection of potential mates, via olfaction. MHC genes make molecules that enable the immune system to recognize invaders; generally, the more diverse the MHC genes of the parents, the stronger the immune system of the offspring. It would therefore be beneficial to have evolved systems of recognizing individuals with different MHC genes and preferentially selecting them to breed with.

Yamazaki et al. (1976) showed this to be the case for male mice, which show a preference for females of different MHC. Similar results have been obtained with fish.

In 1995, Swiss biologist Claus Wedekind determined MHC influences both body odors and body odor preferences in humans, and that the women's preferences depend on their hormonal status. In an experiment, a group of female college students smelled T-shirts that had been worn by male students for two nights, without deodorant, cologne or scented soaps. Overwhelmingly, the women preferred the odors of men with dissimilar MHCs to their own. However, their preference was reversed if they were taking oral contraceptives. The hypothesis is that MHCs affect mate choice and that oral contraceptives can interfere with the preference for variation. A study in 2005 on 58 test subjects confirmed that taking oral contraceptives made women prefer men with MHCs similar to their own. Several follow up studies have confirmed the belief that paternally inherited HLA-associated odors influence odor preference and may serve as social cues. In 2008, Peter Donnelly and colleagues proposed that MHC is related to mating choice in some human populations.

== Complementarity ==
Complementarity in social psychology is defined on the basis of the interpersonal circle (Carson, 1969), according to which interpersonal behaviors fall on a circle with two dimensions, namely dominance (i.e. dominant–submissive) and warmth (i.e. hostile–friendly). It states that each interpersonal behavior invites certain responses of another interactant. The behavior and the response it invites are said to be complementary (Horowitz, Dryer, & Krasnoperova, 1997) when friendly behavior begets hostile behavior, and dominant behavior begets submissive behavior. When people fail to give the invited response, it is said to be a non-complementary interaction. If the first person's behavior invites a reaction from the second person that matches the second person's goals, then the second person is satisfied; otherwise, the second person is frustrated (Dryer & Horowitz, 1997).

Factors influencing Interpersonal attraction

=== Factors affecting complementarity ===
- Setting i.e. in work, at home, in recreation and others

High complementarity in agentic behaviors is found in office settings whereas high complementarity in communal behaviors is found in non-office settings (Moskowitz et al. 2007). In an office setting, dominant agentic behaviors such as setting goals and making suggestions may be complemented with submissive agentic behaviors like avoiding taking the lead and not expressing their own views. At home, recreation and others, on the one hand, friendly communal behaviors such as smiling may invite similar behaviors like compromising about a decision. On the other hand, hostile communal behaviors like showing impatience may beget similar behaviors like showing no response to partners (Moskowitz et al. 2007).

- Social Role Status e.g. supervisors, coworker and supervisee

High complementarity is found in supervisors (high-status, high-powered), they can act freely in their own way. Less complementarity is found in supervisees (low-status, low-powered), as they are normally guided by social norms which mold their behaviors. (Moskowitz, 2007; Locke, 2007).

- Time e.g. strangers, old friends

High levels of complementarity are presumed to be more stable over time than those low levels of complementarity (Tracey, 2004). Greater levels of complementarity are developed when people have known each other for a long time than when they are newly acquainted (Tracey, 2004; Markey, Kurtz, 2006 stated in Moskowitz, 2007). However, contradictory result is also found in a study conducted by Ansell (2008).

== See also ==
- Emotional conflict
- Conflictology
- Interpersonal attraction
- Interpersonal communication
- Interpersonal relations
- Irreconcilable differences
- Social interaction
- Sociometry

== Literature ==
- Burke, RJ; Firth, J; McGrattan, C (December 1974). "Husband-wife compatibility and the management of stress". J Soc Psychol. 94 (2nd half): 243–52. doi:10.1080/00224545.1974.9923211. PMID 4444276.
- Васильев Вл. Н., Рамазанова А. П., Богомаз С. А. Познай других — найди себя (Лекции о психологических типах и их отношениях). — Томск: 1996. — 185 с.
- Гуленко В. В. Структурно-функциональная соционика: Разработка метода комбинаторики полярностей. — Ч.1 — Киев: «Транспорт України», 1999. — 187 с.
- Обозов Н. Н. Психология межличностных отношений. — К.: Высшая школа, 1990.
- Собчик Л. Н. Диагностика психологической совместимости. — СПб.: «Речь», 2002. — 80 с.
- Филатова Е. С. Соционика личных отношений. — М., «Чёрная белка», 2004. — 76 с.
