= Please Understand Me =

Book by David Keirsey

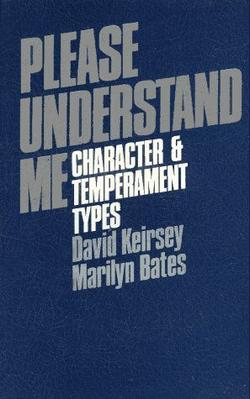
- Author: David Keirsey and Marilyn Bates
- Language: English
- Subject: Temperament, psychology, personality
- Publisher: Prometheus Nemesis Books
- Publication date: 1978
- Publication place: United States
- Media type: Paperback
- Pages: 210
- ISBN: 978-0-935-65202-4
- OCLC: 11585453
- Followed by: Please Understand Me II: Temperament, Character, Intelligence

Please Understand Me: Character and Temperament Types (first published in 1978 as Please Understand Me: An Essay on Temperament Styles) is a psychology book written by David Keirsey and Marilyn Bates which focuses on the classification and categorization of personality types. The book contains a self-assessed personality questionnaire, known as the Keirsey Temperament Sorter, which links human behavioral patterns to four temperament types and sixteen character types. Once the reader's personality type has been ascertained, there are detailed profiles which describe the characteristics of that type.

The first chapter of Please Understand Me

Based upon the notion that people's values differ fundamentally from one another, Keirsey drew upon the views of several psychologists or psychiatrists: Ernst Kretschmer, Erich Adickes, Alfred Adler, Carl Jung, and Isabel Myers who are all mentioned as predecessors in the psychology of temperament or personality. Of these methods, preference is given to the Myers–Briggs test when determining personality type.

== Sixteen personality types ==
Keirsey and Bates offer a personality inventory to help readers identify their type. They are taken from the Myers–Briggs Personality Inventory. The sets of indicated preferences create sixteen types:

- E or I (Extraversion vs. Introversion)
- N or S (INtuition vs. Sensation)
- T or F (Thinking vs. Feeling)
- J or P (Judging vs. Perceiving)

An appendix offers a concise profile description for each of the sixteen types.

== Four temperament types ==
Then Keirsey simplifies these sixteen types into four groups, whose archetypes he equates with the classical four temperaments: SP (Artisan), SJ (Guardian), NT (Rational), and NF (Idealist).

- SP (ISTP, ISFP, ESTP, ESFP): Called the Dionysian or Artisan temperament
- SJ (ISTJ, ISFJ, ESTJ, ESFJ): Called the Epimethean or Guardian temperament
- NT (INTJ, ENTP, INTP, ENTJ): Called the Promethean or Rational temperament
- NF (INFJ, ENFP, INFP, ENFJ): Called the Apollonian or Idealist temperament

Keirsey organizes the groups asymmetrically, asserting Thinking vs. Feeling as the most salient distinction among intuitives, but Judging vs. Perceiving as the most salient distinction among Sensers. His methodology emphasizes the four temperaments, as he defines them, to generalize about different aptitudes and needs.

Please Understand Me II (1998) is a sequel, whose methodology generalizes more so according to these four categories.
