= Paarfieber =

German online dating service

PAARFIEBER
- Website type: Compatibility-based online dating
- Available in: German, English
- Owner: Singles United Media
- Creator: Michael Hacheneier
- Website: www.paarfieber.de
- Commercial: Yes
- Registration: Required
- Users: c. 3 million
- Launched: 9 February 2006; 20 years ago
- Current status: Active

Paarfieber is a German online dating service.

== Overview ==
Launched in February 2006, the website was created by Michael Hacheneier and owned by Singles United Media.

With over 3 million active users, it ranked 18th of all German social networks in March 2013.
