= Dyspeptic =

Dyspeptic may refer to

- Relating to or having dyspepsia
- Having or displaying a morose or melancholic temperament
