= Interpersonal complementarity hypothesis =

Concept in behavioral sciences

Interpersonal complementarity hypothesis asserts that individuals often behave in ways that evoke complementary or reciprocal behavior from others. More specifically, this hypothesis predicts that positive behaviors evoke positive behaviors, negative behaviors evoke negative behaviors, dominant behaviors evoke submissive behaviors, and vice versa.

Essentially, each action carried out by a member of a group has the ability to elicit predictable actions from other group members. For example, individuals who display evidence of positive behavior (e.g., smiling, behaving cooperatively) tend to trigger positively valenced behaviors from others. In much the same way, group members who behave in a docile or submissive fashion tend to elicit complementary, dominant behaviors from other members of the group. This behavioral congruency, as it applies to obedience and authority, has been illustrated in several studies assessing power hierarchies present in groups. These studies highlight the increased comfort experienced by individuals when the power or status behavior of others complement that of their own (e.g., a "leader" preferring a "follower").

== See also ==
- Interpersonal compatibility
- Authority
- Obedience (human behavior)
