= Astrological compatibility =

Astrology that studies relationships

Astrological compatibility (synastry) is the branch of the astrology, that is meant to show compatibility of romantic partners. A natal horoscope is a chart or map of the angles of the planets in the Solar System and their positions in the zodiac at the exact time of a person's birth. These angles represent the positive and negative relationships between the planets. These relationships describe the relationship between the two people under consideration. Compatibility between Zodiac signs is always approached within a particular branch of astrological tradition: Western astrology, Vedic astrology or Chinese astrology.

== Compatibility in Western astrology ==
This principle was most clearly demonstrated in modern times by the work of Carl Jung in his book Synchronicity. Jung was exploring the nature of coincidence for a study. He was offered a collection of over 400 pairs of horoscopes of married couples for this purpose. Jung randomized half of the pairs of horoscopes and attempted to find the couples who were actually married. Jung found a correlation between the married couples that matched astrological prediction. Astonished, he questioned his influence in the study and repeated the experiment with the same results. He again changed his methods and again arrived at the results astrologers predicted. He could not find a causal relationship to explain his correlations, so he termed Synchronicity an acausal principle.

== Compatibility in Indian astrology ==
The Hindu/Indian system of examining compatibility based on horoscopes of the aspirant couple is unique. The fundamental concept of matching horoscopes emanates from constellations occupied by the Ascendant/Lagna (Lagna) at the time of births of bride and bridegroom. Individuals inherit qualities of the birth constellation.

Based on the birth constellations, the following aspects are examined Varna (class), Vashya, Tara, Yoni (animal), Gana (Deva, Manuṣya or Rākṣasa), Graha Maitri, Bhakoota, Nadi, Mahendra, Vedha, Rajju, Stree Deergha, Linga, Gotra, Varga and Yujja for checking compatibility.

In another system, only eight of these factors are given importance and are assigned numeric values – Varna (1 point), Vashya (2 Points), Tara (3 points), Yoni (4 points), Graha Maitri (5 points), Gana (6 points), Bhakoota (7 points) and Nadi (8 points). The total of these factors adds up to 36 points and a horoscope is considered to be matched only if the compatibility score is more than 18.

== See also ==
- Interpersonal compatibility
