= Interpersonal attraction =

Study of the attraction between people that leads to friendship or romance

Interpersonal attraction, as a part of social psychology, is the study of the attraction between people which leads to the development of platonic or romantic relationships. It is distinct from perceptions such as physical attractiveness, and involves views of what is and what is not considered beautiful or attractive.

Meaningful interpersonal relationships depend not only on initial attraction but also on ongoing processes such as reciprocity, mutual trust, credibility, and supportive interactions. These components play a central role in strengthening social bonds and sustaining long-term connections.

Within the study of social psychology, interpersonal attraction is related to how much one likes or dislikes another person. It can be viewed as a force acting between two people that tends to draw them together and to resist their separation. When measuring interpersonal attraction, one must refer to the qualities of the attracted and those of the attractor to achieve predictive accuracy. It is suggested that to determine attraction, both the personalities and the situation must be taken into account.

== Measurement ==
In social psychology, interpersonal attraction is most frequently measured using the Interpersonal Attraction Judgment Scale developed by Donn Byrne. It is a scale in which a subject rates another person on factors such as intelligence, knowledge of current events, morality, adjustment, likability, and desirability as a work partner. This scale seems to be directly related with other measures of social attraction such as social choice, feelings of desire for a date, sexual partner or spouse, voluntary physical proximity, frequency of eye contact, etc.

Kiesler and Goldberg analyzed a variety of response measures that were typically utilized as measures of attraction and extracted two factors: the first, characterized as primarily socioemotional, included variables such as liking, the desirability of the person's inclusion in social clubs and parties, seating choices, and lunching together. The second factor included variables such as voting for, admiration and respect for, and also seeking the opinion of the target. Another widely used measurement technique scales verbal responses expressed as subjective ratings or judgments of the person of interest.

== Causes and effects ==
There are factors that lead to interpersonal attraction. Studies suggest that all factors involve social reinforcement. The most frequently studied include physical attractiveness, propinquity (frequency of interaction), familiarity, similarity, complementarity, reciprocal liking, and reinforcement. The impact of familiarity, for example, is shown in the way physical proximity and interaction enhances cohesiveness, a social concept that facilitates communication and positive attitude towards a particular individual on account of similarities or the ability to satisfy important goals. Similarity is believed to more likely lead to liking and attraction than differences. Numerous studies have focused on the role of physical attractiveness to personal attraction. One finding was that people tend to attribute positive qualities such as intelligence, competence, and warmth to individuals who have a pleasing physical appearance.

Factors influencing Interpersonal attraction

=== Physical attractiveness ===
Physical attractiveness is the perception of the physical traits of an individual human person as pleasing, or beautiful. It can include various implications, such as sexual attractiveness, cuteness, similarity and physique.

Judgment of attractiveness of physical traits is partly universal to all human cultures, partly dependent on culture or society or time period, partly biological, and partly subjective and individual.

According to a study determining the golden ratio for facial beauty, the most attractive face is one with average distances between facial features, and an average length and width of the face itself. Facial attractiveness, or beauty, can also be determined by symmetry. If a face is asymmetrical, this can indicate unhealthy genetic information. Therefore, if a face is symmetrical (see facial symmetry), healthy genetic information is implied. People will judge potential mates based on the physical expression of the genetic health, which is their apparent attractiveness. This supports the good genes theory, which indicates that attractiveness is seen as a way to ensure that offspring will have the healthiest genes and therefore the best chance of survival. Certain traits that indicate good genes (such as clear skin or facial symmetry) are seen as desirable when choosing a partner.

A speed-dating experiment done on graduate students from Columbia University showed that although physical attractiveness is preferred in a potential partner, men show a greater preference for it than women. However, more recent work suggests that sex differences in stated ideal partner-preferences for physical attractiveness disappear when examining actual preferences for real-life potential partners. For example, Eastwick and Finkel (2008) failed to find sex differences in the association between initial ratings of physical attractiveness and romantic interest in potential partners during a speed dating paradigm.

==== Quality of voice ====
In addition to physical looks, quality of voice has also been shown to enhance interpersonal attraction. Oguchi and Kikuchi (1997) had 25 female students from one university rank the level of vocal attraction, physical attraction, and overall interpersonal attraction of 4 male students from another university. Vocal and physical attractiveness had independent effects on overall interpersonal attraction. In a second part of the same study, these results were replicated in a larger sample of students for both genders (62 subjects, 20 males and 42 females with 16 target students, 8 males and 8 females). Similarly, Zuckerman, Miyake and Hodgins (1991) found that both vocal and physical attractiveness contributed significantly to observers' ratings of targets for general attractiveness. These results suggest that when people evaluate one's voice as attractive, they also tend to evaluate that person as physically attractive.

=== Personality ===
Studies have reported mixed findings on whether or not similarity in personality traits between people in interpersonal relationships (romantic, friendship, etc.) is necessary or essential for relationship satisfaction. This has been due to different types of research methodologies used to reach conclusions. It is argued that the previous lack of evidence that congruence in personality traits between two people is an important predictor for relationship satisfaction has been due to individuals making judgements of each other at a salient level (local group) rather than a global group comparison (reference-group effect).

A 2014 study suggested that people who tend to portray positive personality traits such as kindness are typically seen as more attractive than people who portray negative personality traits.

=== Similarity attraction effect ===
The proverb "birds of a feather flock together" has been used to illustrate that similarity is a crucial determinant of interpersonal attraction. Studies about attraction indicate that people are strongly attracted to lookalikes in physical and social appearance. This similarity is in the broadest sense: similarity in bone-structure, characteristics, life goals and physical appearance. The more these points match, the happier, satisfied and prosperous people are in these relationships.

The lookalike effect plays the role of self-affirmation. A person typically enjoys receiving confirmation of aspects of his or her life, ideas, attitudes and personal characteristics, and people seem to look for an image of themselves to spend their life with. A basic principle of interpersonal attraction is the rule of similarity: similarity is attractive — an underlying principle that applies to both friendships and romantic relationships. The proportion of attitudes shared correlates well with the degree of interpersonal attraction. Cheerful people like to be around other cheerful people and negative people would rather be around other negative people. A 2004 study, based on indirect evidence, concluded that humans choose mates based partly on facial resemblance to themselves.

According to Morry's attraction-similarity model (2007), there is a lay belief that people with actual similarity produce initial attraction. The perceived similarity is either self-serving, as in a friendship, or relationship-serving, as in a romantic relationship. In a 1963 study, Theodore Newcomb pointed out that people tend to change perceived similarity to obtain balance in a relationship. Additionally, perceived but not actual similarity was found to predict interpersonal attraction during a face-to-face initial romantic encounter.

In a 1988 study, Lydon, Jamieson & Zanna suggest that interpersonal similarity and attraction are multidimensional constructs in which people are attracted to people similar to themselves in demographics, physical appearance, attitudes, interpersonal style, social and cultural background, personality, preferred interests and activities, and communication and social skills. Newcomb's earlier 1961 study on college-dorm roommates also suggested that individuals with shared backgrounds, academic achievements, attitudes, values, and political views typically became friends.

==== Physical appearance ====
The matching hypothesis proposed by sociologist Erving Goffman suggests that people are more likely to form long standing relationships with those who are equally matched in social attributes, like physical attractiveness. The study by researchers Walster and Walster supported the matching hypothesis by showing that partners who were similar in terms of physical attractiveness expressed the most liking for each other. Another study also found evidence that supported the matching hypothesis: photos of dating and engaged couples were rated in terms of attractiveness, and a definite tendency was found for couples of similar attractiveness to date or engage. Several studies support this evidence of similar facial attractiveness. Penton-Voak, Perrett and Peirce (1999) found that subjects rated the pictures with their own face morphed into it as more attractive. DeBruine (2002) demonstrated in her research how subjects entrusted more money to their opponents in a game play, when the opponents were presented as similar to them. Little, Burt & Perrett (2006) examined similarity in sight for married couples and found that the couples were assessed at the same age and level of attractiveness.

==== Attitudes ====
Based on cognitive consistency theories, difference in attitudes and interests can lead to dislike and avoidance whereas similarity in attitudes promotes social attraction. Miller (1972) pointed out that attitude similarity activates the perceived attractiveness and favorability information from each other, whereas dissimilarity would reduce the impact of these cues.

The studies by Jamieson, Lydon and Zanna (1987–88) showed that attitude similarity could predict how people evaluate their respect for each other, and also predict social and intellectual first impressions – the former by activity preference similarity and the latter by value-based attitude similarity. In intergroup comparisons, high attitude-similarity would lead to homogeneity among in-group members whereas low attitude-similarity would lead to diversity among in-group members, promoting social attraction and achieving high group performance in different tasks.

Although attitude similarity and attraction are linearly related, attraction may not contribute significantly to attitude change.

==== Other social and cultural aspects ====
Byrne, Clore and Worchel (1966) suggested that people with similar economic status are likely to be attracted to each other. Buss & Barnes (1986) also found that people prefer their romantic partners to be similar in certain demographic characteristics, including religious background, political orientation and socio-economic status.

Researchers have shown that interpersonal attraction was positively correlated to personality similarity. People are inclined to desire romantic partners who are similar to themselves on agreeableness, conscientiousness, extroversion, emotional stability, openness to experience, and attachment style.

Activity similarity was especially predictive of liking judgments, which affects the judgments of attraction. According to the post-conversation measures of social attraction, tactical similarity was positively correlated with partner satisfaction and global competence ratings, but was uncorrelated with the opinion change and perceived persuasiveness measures.

When checking similar variables they were also seen as more similar on a number of personality characteristics. This study found that the length of the average relationship was related to perceptions of similarity; the couples who were together longer were seen as more equal. This effect can be attributed to the fact that when time passes by couples become more alike through shared experiences, or that couples that are alike stay together longer.

Similarity has effects on starting a relationship by initial attraction to know each other. It is shown that high attitude similarity resulted in a significant increase in initial attraction to the target person and high attitude dissimilarity resulted in a decrease of initial attraction. Similarity also promotes relationship commitment. Study on heterosexual dating couples found that similarity in intrinsic values of the couple was linked to relationship commitment and stability.

Social homogamy refers to "passive, indirect effects on spousal similarity". The result showed that age and education level are crucial in affecting the mate preference. Because people with similar age study and interact more in the same form of the school, propinquity effect (i.e., the tendency of people to meet and spend time with those who share the common characteristics) plays a significant impact in spousal similarity. Convergence refers to an increasing similarity with time. Although the previous research showed that there is a greater effect on attitude and value than on personality traits, however, it is found that initial assortment (i.e., similarity within couples at the beginning of marriage) rather than convergence, plays a crucial role in explaining spousal similarity.

Active assortment refers to direct effects on choosing someone similar to oneself in mating preferences. The data showed that there is a greater effect on political and religious attitudes than on personality traits. A follow-up issue on the reason of the finding was raised. The concepts of idiosyncratic (i.e. different individuals have different mate preferences) and consensual (i.e. a consensus of preference on some prospective mates to others) in mate preference. The data showed that mate preference on political and religious bases tend to be idiosyncratic, for example, a Catholic would be more likely to choose a mate who is also a Catholic, as opposed to a Buddhist. Such idiosyncratic preferences produce a high level of active assortment which plays a vital role in affecting spousal similarity. In summary, active assortment plays a large role, whereas convergence has little evidence on showing such effect.

=== Propinquity effect ===
The mere-exposure effect, also known as the propinquity effect or the familiarity principle, states that the more a person is exposed to something, the more they come to like it. This applies equally to both objects and people, so in the context of interpersonal attraction, this means that the more we see and interact with a person, the more likely they are to become our friend or sexual partner. However, there are exceptions. Familiarity can also occur without physical exposure. Recent studies show that relationships formed over the Internet resemble those developed face-to-face, in terms of perceived quality and depth.

A clear illustration is in a 1992 study: the researchers had four women of similar appearance attend a large college course over a semester such that each woman attended a different number of sessions (0, 5, 10, or 15). Students then rated the women for perceived familiarity, attractiveness and similarity at the end of the term. Results indicated a strong effect of exposure on attraction that was mediated by the effect of exposure on familiarity. However, exposure does not always increase attraction. For example, the social allergy effect can occur when a person grows increasingly annoyed by and hypersensitive to another's repeated behaviors instead of growing more fond of his or her idiosyncrasies over time.

=== Pheromones ===
Certain pheromones secreted by animals, including humans, can attract others, and this is viewed as being attracted to smell. Human sex pheromones may play a role in human attraction, although it is unclear how well humans can actually sense the pheromones of another.

== Types of attraction ==
The split attraction model describes different types of attraction separating different aspects of experiences people may have. They can roughly be grouped into physical and non-physical. Physical forms of attraction include sexual, sensual and aesthetic attraction. Non-physical may include emotional, romantic, platonic, intellectual, alterous and spiritual attraction.

Sensual attraction is a type of physical attraction to another person involving all the senses, although usually the sense of touch is considered first of all. Sensual attraction is defined as the drive, desire to have non-sexual forms of touch such as sensual cuddling, kissing, holding hands, hugging, massage etc. with another person in particular and other sensual activities like experiencing their voice, odor, taste. Asensual (sometimes known in short as asen) is an identity on the asensual spectrum (asen-spec) defined by a lack of sensual attraction. For non-asensual also known as allosensual people, sensual attraction is involuntary, and possibly even occurs when someone does not know the other person (though one might not act on it). Asensual people do not have this innate desire to have sensual experiences with any specific person. Asensuality refers to the way sensual attraction is experienced, not to how it is acted upon. How asensual people feel about touching others and/or being touched by others and other sensual activities can vastly vary. They may feel disconnected from the idea of engaging in sensual activities or even be repulsed by the concept of sensuality. Terms like touch-averse/repulsed, touch-neutral, touch-positive, or touch-ambivalent can be used to describe some of these feelings. Some asensual people do engage in sensual activities involving other people. This could be for any reason, such as satisfying overall sensual drive not directed toward a particular person, meeting their sensory needs or those of a friend, partner/partners. They may also meet their sensory needs by using a weighted or heated blanket, cuddling with a stuffed animal or pet etc. Being asensual does not mean that one is unable to experience other types of attraction like sexual, aesthetic, emotional etc. including they may participate in sexual activities without the need for sensual enjoyment. It is also important to remember that one can receive pleasure usually associated with a form of attraction without actually feeling that form of attraction.

Some other sensual orientations include bisensuality, homosensuality, heterosensuality etc.

=== Chemistry ===
In the context of relationships, chemistry is a simple emotion that two people get when they share a special connection. It is very early in one's relationship that they can intuitively work out whether they have positive or negative chemistry.

Some people describe chemistry in metaphorical terms, such as "like peanut butter and jelly", or "like a performance". It can be described in the terms of mutual feelings — "a connection, a bond or common feeling between two people", or as a chemical process — "[it] stimulates love or sexual attraction...brain chemicals are definitely involved". A common misconception is that chemistry is an unconscious decision, informed by a complex blend of criteria.

Some of the core components of chemistry are: "non-judgment, similarity, mystery, attraction, mutual trust, and effortless communication". Chemistry can be described as the combination of "love, lust, infatuation, and a desire to be involved intimately with someone".

Research suggests that "not everyone experiences chemistry", and that "chemistry occurred most often between people who are down-to-earth and sincere". This is because "if a person is comfortable with themselves, they are better able to express their true self to the world, which makes it easier to get to know them...even if perspectives on important matters differed." Sharing similarities is also deemed essential to chemistry as "feeling understood is essential to forming relational bonds."

There are various psychological, physical and emotional symptoms of having good chemistry with another person. It has been described as a "combination of basic psychological arousal combined with a feeling of pleasure". The nervous system gets aroused, causing one to get adrenaline in the form of "rapid heartbeat, shortness of breath, and sensations of excitement that are often similar to sensations associated with danger". Other physical symptoms include "blood pressure go[ing] up a little, the skin...flush[ing], the face and ears...turn[ing] red and...[a] feeling of weakness in the knees". However, all these symptoms vary on an individual basis, and not all individuals may experience the same symptoms. One can feel a sense of obsession over the other person, longing for "the day [when they return] to that person". One can also uncontrollably smile whenever thinking about the other person.

There is some debate over whether one can artificially create chemistry if they are "not initially feeling it". While some people hold that it is something that you "can't learn and can't teach...[and you] either have...or you don't", others hold that chemistry is a process rather than a moment, "build[ing] up and adds up and eventually you get this kind of chemical bonding". Some people, while believing it is possible to artificially create chemistry, think that it is better to let chemistry hit them spontaneously.

In Western society, chemistry is generally considered the "igniter [and] catalyst for the relationship", i.e., without this chemistry, there can be no relationship. Having chemistry "can be the difference between a relationship being romantic or platonic". Chemistry "can cause people to act sexually impulsively or unwisely". It can also be the difference between someone remaining faithful in their relationship, and seeking one night stands and affairs.

Dating coach Evan Marc Katz suggests that "chemistry is one of the most misleading indicators of a future relationship. Chemistry predicts nothing but chemistry." This is because chemistry can make people blind to actual incompatibilities or warning signs. Psychologist Laurie Betito notes that arranged marriages actually do quite well in terms of relationship satisfaction, and this is because "a spark can build based on what you have in common. You can grow into love, but you grow out of lust." Neil Clark Warren argues that physical chemistry is important because "couples who don't share strong chemistry may have additional problems during the ups and downs of a life together." Like Betito, he suggests not ruling someone out on the first date due to lack of chemistry. "But", he adds, "if by the second or third date you don't feel a strong inclination to kiss the other person, be near him, or hold his hand, you're probably never going to feel it." Although this quote assumes the other person is male, the truth of the matter is that the other person may instead be female. April Masini likewise says that chemistry is a strong predictor of relationship success. She suggests that chemistry comes and goes, and it is important to actively cultivate it because it can help couples deal with future conflicts.

=== Complementarity theory ===
The model of complementarity explains whether "birds of a feather flock together" or "opposites attract."

Studies show that complementary interaction between two partners increases their attractiveness to each other. Complementary partners preferred closer interpersonal relationship. Couples who reported the highest level of loving and harmonious relationship were more dissimilar in dominance than couples who scored lower in relationship quality.

Mathes and Moore (1985) found that people were more attracted to peers approximating to their ideal self than to those who did not. Specifically, low self-esteem individuals appeared more likely to desire a complementary relationship than high self-esteem people. We are attracted to people who complement us because this allows us to maintain our preferred style of behavior, and interaction with someone who complements our own behavior likely confers a sense of self-validation and security.

==== Similarity or complementarity ====
Principles of similarity and complementarity seem to be contradictory on the surface. In fact, they agree on the dimension of warmth. Both principles state that friendly people would prefer friendly partners.

The importance of similarity and complementarity may depend on the stage of the relationship. Similarity seems to carry considerable weight in initial attraction, while complementarity assumes importance as the relationship develops over time. Markey (2007) found that people would be more satisfied with their relationship if their partners differed from them, at least in terms of dominance, as two dominant persons may experience conflicts while two submissive individuals may have frustration as neither take the initiative.

Perception and actual behavior might not be congruent with each other. There were cases that dominant people perceived their partners to be similarly dominant, yet to independent observers, the actual behavior of their partner was submissive, i.e. complementary to them. Why people perceive their romantic partners to be similar to them despite evidence of the contrary remains unclear.

=== Evolutionary theories ===
The evolutionary theory of human interpersonal attraction states that opposite-sex attraction most often occurs when someone has physical features indicating that he or she is very fertile. Considering that one primary purpose of conjugal/romantic relationships is reproduction, it would follow that people invest in partners who appear very fertile, increasing the chance of their genes being passed down to the next generation.

Evolutionary theory also suggests that people whose physical features suggest they are healthy are seen as more attractive. The theory suggests that a healthy mate is more likely to possess genetic traits related to health that would be passed on to offspring (known as indirect benefits), and also that a healthier mate may be able to provide better resources and parental investment than less healthy mates (known as direct benefits). People's tendency to consider people with facial symmetry more attractive than those with less symmetrical faces is one example. However, a test was conducted that found that perfectly symmetrical faces were less attractive than normal faces. According to this study, the exact ratio of symmetric to asymmetric facial features depicting the highest attraction is still undetermined.

It has also been suggested that people are attracted to faces similar to their own as these features serve as cues of kinship. This preference for facial-resemblance is thought to vary across contexts. For example, a study by DeBruine et al. (2008) found that individuals rated faces which had been manipulated to be similar to their own as having more prosocial attributes, but were less likely to find them sexually attractive. These results support "inclusive fitness theory", which predicts that organisms will help closely related kin over more distant relatives. Results further suggest inherent mate-selective mechanisms that consider costs of inbreeding to offspring health.

=== Increased female attraction to men in relationships ===
A 2009 study by Melissa Burkley and Jessica Parker found that 59% of women tested were interested in pursuing a relationship with an "ideal" single man (who was, unknown to the women, fictitious). When they believed the "ideal" man was already in a romantic relationship, 90% of the women were interested in a romantic relationship.

=== Breaking up ===
There are several reasons that a relationship, whether friendly or romantic, may come to an end (break up). One reason derives from social exchange theory: if a person in the relationship feels that the personal costs of being in the relationship outweigh the rewards, there is a strong chance that this person will end the relationship.

== See also ==
- Bad boy (archetype)
- Beer goggles
- Dating
- Friendship
- Human bonding
- Inertia
- Interpersonal compatibility
- Love (scientific views)
- Physical attractiveness
- Platonic love
- Popularity
- Pratfall effect
- Puppy love
- Queerplatonic relationship
- Romantic attraction
- Romantic friendship
- Seduction
- Sexual attraction
- Socionics
- Social connection
- Vulnerability and care theory of love
