= Keirsey Temperament Sorter =

Personality questionnaire

The Keirsey Temperament Sorter (KTS) is a self-assessed personality questionnaire. It was first introduced in the book Please Understand Me. The KTS is closely associated with the Myers–Briggs Type Indicator (MBTI); however, there are significant practical and theoretical differences between the two personality questionnaires and their associated different descriptions.

== Historical development ==
See also Historical Development of Theories of the Four Temperaments

David Keirsey became familiar with the work of Ernst Kretschmer and William Sheldon after WWII in the late 1940s. Keirsey developed the Temperament Sorter after being introduced to the MBTI in 1956. Tracing the idea of temperament back to the ancient Greeks, Keirsey developed a modern temperament theory in his books Please Understand Me (1978), Portraits of Temperament (1988), Presidential Temperament (1992), Please Understand Me II (1998), Brains and Careers (2008), and Personology (2010). The table below shows how Myers' and Keirsey's types correspond to other temperament theories or constructs, dating from ancient times to the present day.

== Four temperaments ==
Keirsey expanded on the ancient study of temperament by Hippocrates and Plato. In his works, Keirsey used the names suggested by Plato: Artisan (iconic), Guardian (pistic), Idealist (noetic), and Rational (dianoetic). Keirsey divided each of the four temperaments into two categories (roles), each with two types (role variants). The resulting 16 types correlate with the 16 personality types described by Briggs and Myers.

=== Artisan ===
The Artisan temperament is one of four temperaments defined by Keirsey. Correlating with the SP (sensing–perceiving) Myers-Briggs types, the Artisan temperament comprises the following role variants (listed with their correlating Myers-Briggs types): Composer (ISFP), Crafter (ISTP), Performer (ESFP), and Promoter (ESTP). Artisans are concrete and adaptable. Seeking stimulation and virtuosity, they are concerned with making an impact. Their greatest strength is tactics. They excel at troubleshooting, agility, and the manipulation of tools, instruments, and equipment. At their worst, entertainers can become pleasure-seeking, and operators can become hedonistic. The two roles are as follows:

- Operators are the directive (proactive) Artisans. Their most-developed intelligence operation is expediting. The attentive Crafters and the expressive Promoters are the two role variants.
- Entertainers are the informative (reactive) Artisans. Their most developed intelligence operation is improvising. The attentive Composers and the expressive Performers are the two role variants.

=== Guardian ===
The Guardian temperament is one of four temperaments defined by Keirsey. Correlating with the SJ (sensing–judging) Myers–Briggs types, the Guardian temperament comprises the following role variants (listed with their correlating Myers–Briggs types): Inspector (ISTJ), Protector (ISFJ), Provider (ESFJ), and Supervisor (ESTJ). Guardians are concrete and organized (scheduled). Seeking security and belonging, they are concerned with responsibility and duty. Their greatest strength is logistics. They excel at organizing, facilitating, checking, and supporting. The two roles are as follows:

- Administrators are the directive (proactive) Guardians. Their most developed intelligence operation is regulating. The attentive Inspectors and the expressive Supervisors are the two role variants.

- Conservators are the informative (reactive) Guardians. Their most developed intelligence operation is supporting. The attentive Protectors and the expressive Providers are the two role variants.

=== Idealist ===
The Idealist temperament is one of four temperaments defined by Keirsey. Correlating with the NF (intuitive–feeling) Myers-Briggs types, the Idealist temperament comprises the following role variants (listed with their correlating Myers-Briggs types): Champion (ENFP), Counselor (INFJ), Healer (INFP), and Teacher (ENFJ). Idealists are abstract and compassionate. Seeking meaning and significance, they are concerned with personal growth and finding their own unique identity. Their greatest strength is diplomacy. They excel at clarifying, individualizing, unifying, and inspiring. The two roles are as follows:

- Mentors are the directive (proactive) Idealists. Their most developed intelligence operation is developing. The attentive Counselors and the expressive Teachers are the two role variants.

- Advocates are the informative (reactive) Idealists. Their most developed intelligence operation is mediating. The attentive Healers and the expressive Champions are the two role variants.

=== Rational ===
The Rational temperament is one of the four temperaments defined by Keirsey. Correlating with the NT (intuitive–thinking) Myers-Briggs types, the Rational temperament comprises the following role variants (listed with their correlated Myers-Briggs types): Architect (INTP), Fieldmarshal (ENTJ), Inventor (ENTP), and Mastermind (INTJ). Rationals are abstract and objective. Seeking mastery and self-control, they are concerned with their own knowledge and competence. Their greatest strength is strategy. They excel in any kind of logical investigation such as engineering, conceptualizing, theorizing, and coordinating. The two roles are as follows:

- Coordinators are the directive (proactive) Rationals. Their most developed intelligence operation is arranging. The attentive Masterminds and the expressive Fieldmarshals are the two role variants.

- Engineers are the informative (reactive) Rationals. Their most developed intelligence operation is constructing. The attentive Architects and the expressive Inventors are the two role variants.

== Four interaction roles ==
In his book Brains and Careers (2008), Keirsey divided the role variants into groupings that he called "four differing roles that people play in face-to-face interaction with one another."

There are two Proactive Enterprising Roles:

- Initiators (expressive and directive): Field Marshal (ENTJ), Supervisor (ESTJ), Promoter (ESTP), Teacher (ENFJ)—Preemptive
- Contenders (attentive and directive): Mastermind (INTJ), Inspector (ISTJ), Crafter (ISTP), Counselor (INFJ)—Competitive

There are two Reactive Inquiring Roles:

- Coworkers (expressive and informative): Inventor (ENTP), Provider (ESFJ), Performer (ESFP), Champion (ENFP)—Collaborative
- Responders (attentive and informative): Architect (INTP), Protector (ISFJ), Composer (ISFP), Healer (INFP)—Accommodative

The roles were implied in the informing/directing factor introduced in Portraits of Temperament. In his 2010 follow-up book, Personology, "Coworkers" is renamed "Collaborators" and "Responders" is renamed "Accommodators".

== Temperaments and intelligence types ==
The following table shows how the four rings relate to one another and to the various temperaments.

	Temperament	Role	Role Variant
Concrete or Abstract ?	Cooperative or Pragmatic?	Informative or Directive?	Expressive or Attentive?
Observant (S)	Guardian (SJ); Logistical	Conservator (SFJ); Supporting	Provider (ESFJ): Supplying
Observant (S)	Guardian (SJ); Logistical	Conservator (SFJ); Supporting	Protector (ISFJ): Securing
Observant (S)	Guardian (SJ); Logistical	Administrator (STJ); Regulating	Supervisor (ESTJ): Enforcing
Observant (S)	Guardian (SJ); Logistical	Administrator (STJ); Regulating	Inspector (ISTJ): Certifying
Observant (S)	Artisan (SP); Tactical	Entertainer (SFP); Improvising	Performer (ESFP): Demonstrating
Observant (S)	Artisan (SP); Tactical	Entertainer (SFP); Improvising	Composer (ISFP): Synthesizing
Observant (S)	Artisan (SP); Tactical	Operator (STP); Expediting	Promoter (ESTP): Persuading
Observant (S)	Artisan (SP); Tactical	Operator (STP); Expediting	Crafter (ISTP): Instrumenting
Introspective (N)	Idealist (NF); Diplomatic	Advocate (NFP); Mediating	Champion (ENFP): Motivating
Introspective (N)	Idealist (NF); Diplomatic	Advocate (NFP); Mediating	Healer (INFP): Conciliating
Introspective (N)	Idealist (NF); Diplomatic	Mentor (NFJ); Developing	Teacher (ENFJ): Educating
Introspective (N)	Idealist (NF); Diplomatic	Mentor (NFJ); Developing	Counselor (INFJ): Guiding
Introspective (N)	Rational (NT); Strategic	Engineer (NTP); Constructing	Inventor (ENTP): Devising
Introspective (N)	Rational (NT); Strategic	Engineer (NTP); Constructing	Architect (INTP): Designing
Introspective (N)	Rational (NT); Strategic	Coordinator (NTJ); Arranging	Fieldmarshal (ENTJ): Mobilizing
Introspective (N)	Rational (NT); Strategic	Coordinator (NTJ); Arranging	Mastermind (INTJ): Entailing

== Myers–Briggs types versus Keirsey's temperaments ==
The type descriptions of Isabel Myers differ from the character descriptions of David Keirsey in several important ways:

- Myers primarily focused on how people think and feel; Keirsey focused more on behavior, which is directly observable.
- Myers's descriptions use a linear four-factor model; Keirsey's descriptions use a systems field theory model.
- Myers, following Jung's lead, emphasized the extraversion/introversion (expressive/attentive) dichotomy; Keirsey's model places greater importance on the sensing/intuition (concrete/abstract) dichotomy.
- Myers grouped types by 'function attitudes'; Keirsey, by temperament.

Myers grouped types according to cognitive function: the 'thinking type' grouping for those with dominant thinking; the 'intuitive type' grouping for those with dominant intuition; the 'feeling type' grouping for those with dominant feeling; and the 'sensing type' grouping for those with dominant sensing. Keirsey's temperaments correlate with Myers' combinations of preferences: Guardians with sensing plus judging (SJ); Artisans with sensing plus perceiving (SP); Idealists with intuition plus feeling (NF); and Rationals with intuition plus thinking (NT).

Myers paired ESTJs with ENTJs, ISFPs with INFPs, INTPs with ISTPs, and ENFJs with ESFJs because they share the same dominant function attitude. ESTJs and ENTJs are both extraverted thinkers, ISFPs and INFPs are both introverted feelers, INTPs and ISTPs are both introverted thinkers, and ENFJs and ESFJs are both extraverted feelers. Keirsey holds that these same groupings are very different from one another because they are of different temperaments. ESTJs are Guardians whereas ENTJs are Rationals; ISFPs are Artisans whereas INFPs are Idealists; INTPs are Rationals whereas ISTPs are Artisans; and ENFJs are Idealists whereas ESFJs are Guardians.

== Empirical validation ==
In a 2001 peer-reviewed study published in the Journal of Career Assessment, data from the Keirsey Temperament Sorter II online instrument and Myers–Briggs Type Indicator (MBTI) for 203 college freshmen were analyzed and compared. Positive correlations appeared between the concurrent MBTI and Keirsey measures of psychological type, giving preliminary support to the validity of the online version of Keirsey.

== See also ==
- Analytical psychology
- Carl Jung
- Eduard Spranger, author of Types of men
- Ernst Kretschmer
- Five temperaments
- Four temperaments
- Socionics
- Temperament
- Type theory
