= Hartman Personality Profile =

Pseudoscientific personality test

The Color Code Personality Profile also known as The Color Code or The People Code is a personality test designed by Taylor Hartman. Despite being widely used in business and other fields, it is a pseudoscience.

== Classifying the motive types ==
The Hartman Personality Profile is based on the notion that all people possess one of four driving "core motives". The Color Code is based on four types of personality, identified by color: Red, (motivated by power); Blue, (motivated by intimacy); White, (motivated by peace); and Yellow, (motivated by fun). Although demographic groups vary, Hartman suggests that Reds comprise 25% of the population; Blues 35%; Whites 20%; and Yellows 20%. There is no scientific proof to support these claims.

== Criticism ==
The Hartman Institute and its many subsidiaries offer "coaches" to businesses seeking to improve interpersonal relations, for career counselling, or to collect data for use in hiring practices. The test informally passes most psychometric measures of reliability and face validity, but this may be attributed to the open predictability of the test. The criteria are likely self-fulfilling to an extent. Although internal and small sample corporate-sponsored data have been reported, no peer-reviewed studies of the psychometric value of the test exist.

== See also ==
- Table of similar systems of comparison of temperaments
