= Similarity (psychology) =

Psychological proximity of two mental representations

Similarity refers to the psychological degree of identity of two mental representations. It is fundamental to human cognition since it provides the basis for categorization of entities into kinds and for various other cognitive processes. It underpins our ability to interact with unknown entities by predicting how they will behave based on their similarity to entities we are familiar with. Research in cognitive psychology has taken a number of approaches to the concept of similarity. Each of them is related to a particular set of assumptions about knowledge representation.

== Cognitive psychological approaches ==
=== Mental distance approaches ===
Mental distance approaches (Shepard 1962) assume that mental representations can be conceptualized as some kind of mental space. Concepts are represented as points within the space. Similarity between concepts is a function of the distance between the concepts in space. Concepts represented by points that are near to each other are more psychologically similar than are points that are conceptually distant. A strength of this approach is there are many mathematical techniques for deriving spaces from data such as multidimensional scaling (Shepard 1962) and latent semantic analysis (Landauer & Dumais 1997).

=== Featural approaches ===
Featural approaches (Tversky 1977) were developed to address limitations of the mental distance approaches. For example, spaces are symmetric. The distance between two points is the same regardless of which point you start from. However, psychological similarity is not symmetric. For example, we often prefer to state similarity in one direction. For example, it feels more natural to say that 101 is like 100 than to say that 100 is like 101. Furthermore, many metaphors are also directional. Saying "That surgeon is a butcher" means something quite different from saying "That butcher is a surgeon."

Featural approaches assumed that people represent concepts by lists of features that describe properties of the items. A similarity comparison involves comparing the feature lists that represent the concepts. Features that are shared in the feature lists are commonalities of the pair and features that are contained in one feature set but not the other are differences of the pair. It is possible to account for people's intuitions or ratings of the similarities between concepts by assuming that judgments of similarity increase with the number of commonalities (weighted by the salience of those commonalities) and decreases with the number of differences (weighted by the salience of the differences).

=== Structural approaches ===
Structural approaches to similarity (Gentner & Markman 1997) were developed to address limitations of the featural account. In particular, featural approaches assume that the commonalities and differences are independent of each other. However, commonalities and differences are not psychologically independent. In fact, determining the differences between a pair requires finding the commonalities. Consider the comparison between a car and a motorcycle. Both have wheels. That is a commonality. However, cars have four wheels, while motorcycles have two wheels. That is a difference. Because this difference required first finding a commonality between the pair, it is called an alignable difference. Alignable differences contrast with nonalignable differences which are aspects of one concept that have no correspondence in the other. For example, cars have seatbelts and motorcycles do not. Research suggests that alignable differences have a larger impact on people's judgments of similarity than do nonalignable differences. Thus, the relationship between the commonalities of a pair and the differences is important for understanding people's assessments of similarity. Structural approaches to similarity emerged from research on analogy.

=== Transformational approaches ===
Transformational accounts of similarity (Hahn, Chater & Richardson 2003) were developed to evaluate similarity independently of the type of mental representation. On this view, any mental representation can be transformed into another mental representation through some series of steps. For any representation system and set of transformations, it is possible to define the shortest set of steps (i.e., the shortest program) that will transform one representation into another. The shorter this minimal program, the more similarity the pair of concepts. Larkey & Markman (2005) found some evidence against this view, showing that the number of steps to transform the colors and shapes of geometric objects does not predict people's similarity judgments for those objects.

== Social psychological approaches ==
In social psychology large amounts of empirical evidence indicate that similarity breeds liking; this is known as the similarity effect. Similarity refers to personality, attitudes, values, interests, and attraction shared between to individuals. Similarity is closely related to Bryne's social psychology model of interpersonal attraction (1961) which is determined by four variables: propinquity (how our environment and situation play a role in determining how often and to what degree we come in contact), need for affiliation, overt stimulus characteristics (refers to the observable attributes of an individual that serve to elicit positive or negative responses from others), and similarity. In short we determine our attraction or liking of another by positive and negative reinforcements and our emotions concerning the matter. When Individual A receives positive reinforcement from individual B, A's attraction toward B, increases the reverse is also true. Attitude similarity has also been found to serve as a strong foundation for long lasting friendship. Friends who share a similar interest in activities where more likely to perceive similarity and liking then those who shared similar attitudes. An individual's perceived similarity with another has been proven to show potential for romantic relationships even though actual similarity was reported to be low. These findings explain that individuals are more likely to be attracted to those who they perceive to share similar activities with such as occupation and hobbies. Propinquity also explains the relationship between liking and activities, those with similar interests tend to put themselves into similar types of settings increasing their chances of interaction. As frequency of interaction between 2 or more people increases, the degree of perceived similarity and liking for one another increases eventually leading to long lasting relationships.

Several explanations have been offered to explain in what way similarity increases interpersonal attraction (like-prefers-like). First, people with similar interests tend to put themselves into similar types of settings. For example, two people interested in literature are likely to run into each other in the library and form a relationship (involving the propinquity effect). Another explanation is that we notice similar people, and expect a relationship to be interpersonally validating and beneficial because of similar attitudes, behaviours and values. People are susceptible to making negative judgements about those who are 'out of group' than 'in group' from them socially, behaviorally or of different morals and values. Specifically, the 'Big Five' personality trait dimensions (extroversion and introversion, agreeableness and disagreeableness, openness and closeness, conscientiousness and apathetic, as well as mental stability and neuroticism) are behavioural traits often used to assess similarity or dissimilarity in relationships.

== See also ==
- Rapport
- Similarity (philosophy)
