= Fundamental interpersonal relations orientation =

W. Schutz's social behavior theory

Fundamental Interpersonal Relations Orientation (FIRO) is a theory of interpersonal relations, introduced by William Schutz in 1958. This theory mainly explains the interpersonal interactions of a local group of people. The theory is based on the belief that when people get together in a group, there are three main interpersonal needs they are looking to obtain – affection/openness, control and inclusion. Schutz developed a measuring instrument that contains six scales of nine-item questions, and this became version B (for "Behavior"). This technique was created to measure how group members feel when it comes to inclusion, control, and affection/openness or to be able to get feedback from people in a group.

== Description ==
These categories measure how much interaction a person wants in the areas of socializing, leadership and responsibilities, and more intimate personal relations. FIRO-B was created, based on this theory, as a measurement instrument with scales that assess the behavioral aspects of the three dimensions. Scores are graded from 0–9 in scales of expressed and wanted behavior, which define how much a person expresses to others, and how much he wants from others. Schutz believed that FIRO scores in themselves were not terminal, and can and do change, and did not encourage typology; however, the four temperaments were eventually mapped to the scales of the scoring system, which led to the creation of a theory of five temperaments.

Schutz himself discussed the impact of extreme behavior in the areas of inclusion, control, and openness as indicated by scores on the FIRO-B (and the later Element-B). For each area of interpersonal need the following three types of behavior would be evident: (1) deficient, (2) excessive, and (3) ideal. Deficient was defined as indicating that an individual was not trying to directly satisfy the need. Excessive was defined as indicating that an individual was constantly trying to satisfy the need. Ideal referred to satisfaction of the need. From this, he identified the following types:

Schutz composed a "Matrix of Relevant Interpersonal Data", which he called "The Elephant". Each area consisted of a smaller matrix of "act" and "feel" by "Self to Other" (Action), "Other to Self" (Reaction), and "Self to Self".

"Act" and "Feel" divided the rows, which were:
"Desired Interpersonal Relations (Needs)", which denoted "satisfactory relations" in each area;
"Ideal Interpersonal Relations" is what would correspond to "moderate" expressed and wanted scores;
"Anxious Interpersonal Relations" was subdivided into rows of "Too much activity" (covering high expressed scores) and "Too little activity" (covering low expressed scores); both being divided into "Act" and "feel".
The last row was "Pathological Interpersonal relations", which was divided into "too much" and "too little", yielding:
"Psychotic (Schizophrenia)" as Too Little/Inclusion; (There was no "Too Much/Inclusion")
"Obsessive-compulsive" as Too Much/Control and "Psychopath" as Too Little/Control; and
"Neurotic" as too much and too little Affection.

"Self-to other (action)" corresponded to the expressed dimension, and "Other to self (Reaction)" was the basis for the wanted dimension (though it is phrased in terms of what people do, rather than what we want them to do, which would be similar to the later Element B). We thus end up with the six dimensions as follows:

Expressed Inclusion (eI): "I initiate interaction with others" (High: "outstanding"; low "shy")
Wanted Inclusion (wI): "I want to be Included" (High: "friendly"; low: "aloof")
expressed Control (eC): "I try to control others" (High: "authoritarian"; low: "absent-minded")
Wanted Control (wC): "I want to be controlled" (High: "submissive"; low: "rebellious")
Expressed Affection (eA): "I try to be close and personal" (High: "empathetic"; low: "cold")
Wanted Affection (wA): "I want others to be close and personal with me" (High: "needy"; low: "defensive")

Putting them together, Schutz came up with fifteen "Descriptive Schema and appropriate terminology for each Interpersonal Need Area":

Score	Inclusion	Control	Affection
Low e and w	Shy; Aloof	Absent-minded; Rebellious	Cold; Defensive
high e and w	Outstanding; Friendly	Authoritarian; Submissive	Empathetic; Needy
High e but low w	Outstanding; Aloof	Authoritarian; Rebellious	Empathetic; Defensive
low e but high w	Shy; Friendly	Absent-minded; Submissive	Cold; Needy
moderate e and w	Social	Democrat	Personal

In 1977, a clinical psychologist who worked with FIRO-B, Dr. Leo Ryan, produced maps of the scores for each area, called "locator charts", and assigned names for all of the score ranges in his Clinical Interpretation of The FIRO-B:

Score	Inclusion	Control	Affection	Temperament by APS (all 3 areas)
Low e and w	The Loner	The Rebel	The Pessimist	Melancholy
moderate e, low w	"Now You See Him, Now You Don't" Tendencies	Self-Confident	"Image of Intimacy" Tendency	Phlegmatic Melancholy / Phlegmatic Choleric
High e, low w	Now You See Him, Now You Don't	Mission Impossible	Image/(Mask) of Intimacy	Choleric
high e, moderate w	The Conversationalist	"Mission Impossible" with Narcissistic Tendencies	Living Up To Expectations	Sanguine Phlegmatic / Choleric Phlegmatic
high e and w	People Gatherer (formerly, "Where are the People?")	Dependent-Independent conflict	The Optimist	Sanguine
moderate e, high w	Hidden Inhibitions	Let's Take a Break	Cautious Lover In Disguise	Phlegmatic Supine / Phlegmatic Sanguine
low e, high w	Inhibited Individual	Openly Dependent Person; (w=6: Loyal Lieutenant)	Cautious Lover	Supine
low e, moderate w	Cautious Expectation	The Checker	Careful Moderation	Supine Phlegmatic / Melancholy Phlegmatic
moderate e and w	Social Flexibility	The Matcher	Warm Individual/The Golden Mean	Phlegmatic

However, to continue not to encourage typology, the names (which were for clinical interpretation primarily) are generally not used, and Element-B test results usually total the E, W, I, C and O scores individually. In the derivative "five temperament" system, the different scores are grouped into their corresponding temperaments, and considered inborn types. One key difference is in the "high wanted" scores in the area of Control. A distinction is made between men and women, with men being "dependent", and women, rather than really being dependent, only being "tolerant" of control by others. This is attributed to "the stereotypical role of women in Western Culture", where they were often dependent, and have simply learned to tolerate control from others. This again, reflects FIRO's belief that these scores reflect learned behavior. In five temperament theory, no such distinction between the sexes is recognized, and high wanted scores in Control are seen as an inborn dependency need in both sexes.

=== Compatibility Theory ===
Another part of the theory is "compatibility theory", which features the roles of originator, reciprocal, and interchange.

Originator compatibility, involves possible clashes between expressed and wanted behaviors. The example given, is two people with high eC and low wC (a.k.a. "Mission Impossible" or "Autocrat Rebellious"). They: "will both want to originate the behaviors associated with the Control needs, and neither will want to receive those behaviors. Both persons will want to set the agenda, take responsibility, and direct and structure the actions of others; neither will feel comfortable taking direction. The result could be competition or even conflict."

Reciprocal compatibility is (from another example given from Control), where high eC with low wC interacts with the opposite: low eC with high wC ("Openly Dependent", "Loyal Lieutenant", or "Abdicrat Submissive").

"there is a high degree of reciprocal compatibility because... one will take charge; the other will be happy to let him or her assume the responsibility."

Interchange compatibility measures how much individuals share the same need strengths. The example is two people with both high eA and wA ("Optimist" or "Overpersonal Personal-compliant"). They "will be compatible because both will see Affection behaviors as the basis of the relationship, and they will engage each other around Affection needs." (i.e. freely give and receive).

== Further development ==
During the 1970s, Schutz revised and expanded FIRO theory and developed additional instruments for measuring the new aspects of the theory, including Element B: Behavior (an improved version of FIRO-B); Element F: Feelings; Element S: Self; Element W: Work Relations; Element C: Close Relations; Element P: Parental Relationships; and Element O: Organizational Climate. Since 1984, these instruments have been known collectively as Elements of Awareness. Element B differs in expanding the definitions of Inclusion, Control, and Affection (renamed "Openness"), into an additional six scores to measure how much a person wants to include, control, and be close to others, and how much other people include, control, and like to be close to the client. "Expressed" is renamed "See" (current behaviors) while "Want" remains desired behaviors. Each of the three areas is split into "Do" (initiating interaction with others) and "Get" (the level received from others). Differences between See and Want scores indicate levels of dissatisfaction.

The original FIRO-B was sold to CPP, Inc. (now The Myers-Briggs Company), which also publishes the MBTI assessment, and FIRO Element B is owned by Business Consultants Network, Inc.

A third FIRO system, called FIRO-Space™ is being developed by Dr. Henry L. Thompson who developed the second one.

== Correlations with MBTI ==
In a 1976 survey of seventy-five of the most widely used training instruments, the FIRO-B was found to be the most generally usable instrument in training. The popularity of the FIRO-B began to wane as the MBTI became one of the instruments of choice in business. Since FIRO-B uses completely different scales from MBTI, and was not designed to measure inborn "types," it is often used together with the MBTI by workplaces. Now the two are offered together by The Myers-Briggs Company.

Statistical correlation has been observed between FIRO-B and MBTI by John W. Olmstead, and also Allen L. Hammer with Eugene R. Schnell; and between Element B and MBTI by Dr. Henry Dick Thompson.

FIRO-B Scale	E-I	S-N	T-F	J-P
Expressed Inclusion	−59***	04	11*	00
Wanted Inclusion	−28***	11*	12*	12*
Expressed Control	−23***	03	−23***	−01
Wanted Control	04	−09	16***	−05
Expressed Affection	−52***	06	22***	07
Wanted Affection	−31***	02	17***	07

Element B Scales	EI	SN	TF	JP
I include people	-.48*	.18*	.16*	.08
I want to include people	-.33*	.09	.21*	.08
People include me	-.43*	.14*	-.02	.11
I want people to include me	-.28*	.09	-.07	.01
I control people	-.30*	.14	-.13*	.02
I want to control people	-.13*	.04	-.08	.05
People control me	-.11	.00	.17*	.01
I want people to control me	-.06	-.06	.12	.03
I am open with people	-.13*	.19*	.29*	.07
I want to be open with people	-.20*	.22*	.28*	.02
People are open with me	-.23*	.44*	.16*	.12
I want people to be open with me	-.21*	.28*	.22*	.07

FIRO-B and MBTI Correlations

* p < .05
**p < .01
***p < .001
Negative correlations associated with E, S, T and J.
Positive correlations associated with I, N, F and P.

Element B and MBTI Correlations

*Indicates statistical significance
