= Supine (disambiguation) =

A supine is a verbal noun in some languages.

Supine may also refer to:

- Supine (temperament), a temperament in the psychological model of five temperaments
- Supine cockpit, a position for a pilot to withstand G-force
- Supine position, the position of the body lying with the face up
- Supination, a position of either the forearm or foot

== See also ==
- Anatomical terms of location
