= Balance (metaphysics) =

Point between two opposite forces that is desirable

In metaphysics, balance is a point between two opposite forces that is desirable over purely one state or the other, such as a balance between the metaphysical order and chaos — law by itself being overly controlling, chaos being overly unmanageable, balance being the point that minimizes the negatives of both.

More recently, the term "balance" has come to refer to a balance of power between multiple opposing forces. Lack of balance (of power) is generally considered to cause aggression by stronger forces towards weaker forces less capable of defending themselves. In the real world, unbalanced stronger forces tend to portray themselves as balanced, and use media controls to downplay this, as well as prevent weaker forces from coming together to achieve a new balance of power. In constructed worlds, such as in video gaming, where nearly all-powerful corporate interests strive to maintain a balance of power among players, players tend to be extremely vocal about what they see as unbalanced mechanics, providing the unbalance negatively affects them. Though the strong and unbalanced (or "overpowered") players commonly are vigorous in denial of any lack of balance, the comparative media equality among all player brings change quickly, to further a sense of balance.

== Artistic balance ==
The twentieth century saw the development of both law and chaos in art and art music to the point that the end product became unintelligible at an instinctive/emotional level. Many composers saw one or other of these controlling trends as superior to the other. The truth may lie in a fundamental acceptance of balance as the controlling force in art. In time, we may even come to accept balance between structural and emotional as the essence of beauty.

== Moral balance ==
In philosophy, the concept of moral balance exists in various forms, one of them is the golden mean, which has virtue being between the extreme and the lacking. Greek philosophers—such as Plato, Aristotle, and the Pythagoreans (who related moral excellence with mathematical perfection)—applied the principle to ethics as well as politics. "Nothing in excess" was one of the three phrases carved into the Temple of Apollo at Delphi.

In Buddhism, this concept is known as the middle way, or samatā, which stated that the way to nirvana led between bodily sexual indulgence and self-mortification and asceticism.

Confucian teachings contain the similar doctrine of Zhōngyōng; the middle.

== See also ==
- Kybalion
- Yin and yang
