= David Keirsey =

American psychologist (1921–2013)

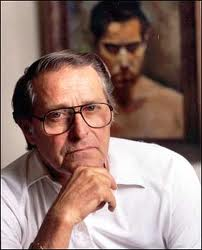
- Born: August 31, 1921; Oklahoma
- Died: July 30, 2013 (aged 91)
- Citizenship: American
- Education: Pomona College; Claremont Graduate University
- Known for: Please Understand Me, Keirsey Temperament Sorter
- Scientific career
- Fields: Personality psychology
- Workplaces: formerly California State University

David West Keirsey (/ˈkɜːrziː/; August 31, 1921 – July 30, 2013) was an American psychologist, a professor emeritus at California State University, Fullerton, and the author of several books. In his most popular publications, Please Understand Me (1978, co-authored by Marilyn Bates) and the revised and expanded second volume Please Understand Me II (1998), he laid out a self-assessed personality questionnaire, known as the Keirsey Temperament Sorter, which links human behavioral patterns to four temperaments and sixteen character types. Both volumes of Please Understand Me contain the questionnaire for type evaluation with detailed portraits and a systematic treatment of descriptions of temperament traits and personality characteristics. With a focus on conflict management and cooperation, Keirsey specialized in family and partnership counseling and the coaching of children and adults.

== Early life, education and professional experience ==
Keirsey was born in Ada, Oklahoma. He moved with his family at the age of two years to Southern California. Drafted by the Army during World War II, he joined the Navy and became a Marine fighter pilot, and served in the Pacific theatre off an aircraft carrier. He earned his bachelor's degree from Pomona College and his master's and doctorate degrees from Claremont Graduate University (then known as Claremont Graduate School). In 1950, he started his career dealing with youth as a counselor at a probation ranch home for delinquent boys. Subsequently, he spent twenty years working in public schools, engaged in corrective interventions intended to help troubled and troublesome children stay out of trouble. Over the next eleven years at California State University, Fullerton, he trained corrective counselors to identify deviant habits of children, parents, and teachers, and to apply techniques aimed at enabling them to abandon such habits.

== Development of temperament theories ==
Keirsey has written extensively about his model of four temperaments (Artisan, Guardian, Idealist, and Rational) and sixteen role variants. His research and observation of human behavior started after he returned from World War II, when he served in the Pacific as a Marine fighter pilot.

Keirsey traced his work back to Hippocrates, Plato and Aristotle. Among his modern influences he counts the works of William James, John Dewey, Ernst Kretschmer, William Sheldon, Jay Haley, Gregory Bateson, Max Wertheimer, Wolfgang Kohler, Raymond Holden Wheeler, Erich Fromm, Alfred Adler, Rudolf Dreikurs, Milton Erickson, and Erving Goffman. He considered himself the last of the Gestalt psychologists.

In 1921, Carl Jung published the book Psychological Types, which proposed a concept of psychological types based on introversion versus extraversion, thinking versus feeling as rational functions, sensation versus intuition as irrational functions, and the coexistence of dominant and auxiliary functions. Isabel Briggs Myers and her mother, Katharine Cook Briggs, subsequently extended and codified Jung's ideas into a test for sixteen psychological types, called the Myers-Briggs Type Indicator. In a two-page chart of "Characteristics of Types in High School" (Myers Briggs Manual, Form E 1958), Isabel Myers described the sixteen types briefly. Keirsey recognized these very brief sixteen descriptions as being accurate, mirroring his observations as a school psychologist, and used these descriptions as a basis in a greatly expanded and modified form of his own. Keirsey's critical innovation was organizing these types into four temperaments and describing "observable behavior" rather than speculation about unobservable thoughts and feelings. Keirsey provided his own definitions of the sixteen types, and related them to the four temperaments based on his studies of five behavioral sciences: anthropology, biology, ethology, psychology, and sociology. While Myers wrote mostly about the Jungian psychological functions, which are mental processes, Keirsey focused more on how people use words in sending messages and use tools in getting things done, which are observable actions. Keirsey performed an in-depth, systematic analysis and synthesis of aspects of personality for temperament, which included the temperament's unique interests, orientation, values, self-image, and social roles.

Keirsey's theory blended the sixteen Myers-Briggs types with Ernst Kretschmer's model of four "temperament types", which Keirsey traced back to the classical Greek philosophers, Plato and Aristotle, as well as other ancient writers.

Myers grouped types according to dominant cognitive function, as follows:

- Introverted Thinking: INTPs and ISTPs
- Introverted Intuition: INFJs and INTJs
- Introverted Feeling: INFPs and ISFPs
- Introverted Sensing: ISTJs and ISFJs
- Extraverted Feeling: ENFJs and ESFJs
- Extraverted Thinking: ENTJs and ESTJs
- Extraverted iNtuition: ENFPs and ENTPs
- Extraverted Sensing: ESFPs and ESTPs

Keirsey, however, influenced by Kretschmer's types (Hyperesthetics, Anesthetics, Melancholics, and Hypomanics), grouped the types differently, arguing that the four NFs (iNtuitive/Feeling types) were Hyperesthetic (oversensitive), the four NTs (iNtuitive/Thinking) were Anesthetic (insensitive), the four SJs (Sensing/Judging) were Melancholic (depressive), and the four SPs (Sensing/Perceiving) were Hypomanic (excitable). At the time (mid-1950s), Keirsey was mainly interested in the relationship between temperament and abnormal behavior, finding that Ernst Kretschmer and his disciple William Sheldon were the only ones who wrote about this relationship.

== ADHD controversy ==
As a clinical psychologist, Keirsey regarded the prescription of psychotropic stimulants as a treatment of attention deficit hyperactivity disorder (ADHD), where activity or temperament of school children is considered disruptive to classroom proceedings, as not only unnecessary but harmful to these children. He was an ardent critic of what he saw as an "epidemic abuse of children", and claimed to be successful in the management of such children by applying what he called the "method of logical consequences".

Keirsey asserted that Attention Deficit Disorder (ADD) was an altogether different matter, in that these children were inactive and paid no attention to the teacher's agenda, and that ADD was defined exclusively by stating what they do not do, and in no way defined their observable behavior. Thus, in his opinion, ADD was a misleading label assigned to children who ignored the teacher while bothering nobody, unlike the children who are actually disruptive. Keirsey referred to the practice of medicating children with ADD as "The Great ADD Hoax". His main claim was that children labeled ADHD or ADD, typically, have an SP, or Artisan temperament, meaning concrete in thought and speech, and utilitarian in implementing goals.

== See also ==
- Anti-psychiatry
- Biological psychiatry
- Chemical imbalance theory
