= California Psychological Inventory =

Psychological test

The California Psychological Inventory (CPI) also known as California Personality Inventory is a self-report inventory created by Harrison G. Gough and currently published by Consulting Psychologists Press. The text containing the test was first published in 1956, and the most recent revision was published in 1996. It was created in a similar manner to the Minnesota Multiphasic Personality Inventory (MMPI)—with which it shares 194 items. But unlike the MMPI, which focuses on maladjustment or clinical diagnosis, the CPI was created to assess the everyday "folk-concepts" that ordinary people use to describe the behavior of the people around them.

== Test design ==
The CPI is made up of 434 true-false questions, of which 171 were taken from the original version of the MMPI. The test is scored on 18 scales, three of which are validity scales. Eleven of the non-validity scales were selected by comparing responses from various groups of people. The other four were content validated. However, factor analysis was not used in the development of the test, and many of the scales are highly inter-correlated and conceptually similar.

The test is typically used with people aged 13 years and older. It takes about 45–60 minutes to complete.

The revised third edition of the CPI contains 434 items. This latest version requires that the patient's false and true answers be transformed at an additional cost into raw scale and Standard scores by the publisher, who will also provide interpretative report writing. The older CPI with the 462 items is still available for sale by the publisher, Consulting Psychologists Press, and comes with plastic scoring keys and profile sheets, thus allowing each research or clinical psychologist to score the test by hand, a less expensive alternative, perhaps for use in training psychology students.

=== Subtests ===
As stated in the ETS Test Collection Catalog, The CPI contains the following 20 scales:

- Dominance
- Capacity for Status
- Sociability
- Social Presence
- Self-Acceptance
- Independence
- Empathy
- Responsibility
- Socialization
- Self-Control
- Good Impression
- Communality
- Sense of Well-Being
- Tolerance
- Achievement via Conformance
- Achievement via Independence
- Intellectual Efficiency
- Psychological-Mindedness
- Flexibility
- Femininity-Masculinity

== Scoring ==
The inventory contains 434 items which can be scored to yield 18 scales. The 18 scales are further grouped into four classes: (1) measures of poise, ascendancy, self-assurance, and interpersonal adequacy; (2) measures of socialization, responsibility, intrapersonal values, and character; (3) measures of achievement potential and intellectual efficiency; (4) measures of intellectual modes and interest modes.

This paragraph will discuss what are referred to as the Structural Scales of the CPI-462 version, using information being provided by the manual for that version, the CPI Administrator's Guide from 1987. Alpha, Beta, Delta and Gamma personality types are conveniently illustrated by a score's placement on a grid defined by the two dimensions – the degree to which the person is norm-favoring or norm-questioning on one dimension (called the v.2 scale), and the degree to which he or she is more externally or internally focused (the v.1 scale). Alpha personality types are more enterprising, dependable and outgoing. Betas are reserved, responsible and moderate. Gammas are adventurous, restless, and pleasure-seeking. Finally, Deltas are withdrawn, private, and to some extent disaffected. In a separate measure known as Realization, also referred to as the v.3 scale, a tester's score may reflect the degree to which he or she is reflective, capable, and optimistic about the present and future, when the score is high, or possesses the opposite characteristics when low. Thus, research scientists or medical or psychology graduate students tend to score high on this scale, while psychiatric patients, juvenile delinquents, prison inmates and even high school students in general (who lack life experience and are still forging a solid sense of identity) tend to score low.

Another component of this test are the 20 Folk Concept Scales (18 in the CPI-434 version) – measuring Dominance, Capacity for Status, Sociability, Social Presence, Self-acceptance, Independence, Empathy, Responsibility, Socialization, Self-control, Good Impression, Communality, Well-being, Tolerance, Achievement via Conformance, Achievement via Independence, Intellectual Efficiency, Psychological-mindedness, Flexibility, and Femininity/Masculinity. These scales are called "folk" as they attempt to capture personality themes that should be broadly cross-cultural and easily understood around the world. This test is thus an attempt to tap into personality factors that arise without exception to some, varying, degree, in all humans regardless of cultural context, and which provide a picture of people's relatively stable tendencies and characteristics, which is as good as any definition for what is loosely termed their unique "personality".

== Validity ==
Correlations between CPI scales and related external criteria tend to fall in the .2 to .5 ranges. This degree of correlation is typical for much of personality research. Extremely high correlations are not likely to be found for personality measures because the scales typically try to assess rather broad behavioral tendencies.

Norms are available for males only, females only, and male/female data combined. The CPI has been very popular in research and in individual assessments of adolescents and adults. The fact that it was developed and normed on non-psychiatric or non-clinical populations is regarded almost universally as part of its positive reputation and usefulness among psychologists.

== Reliability ==
Despite the CPI's dichotomous response format, the reliabilities were uniformly high and held up well in both validation samples, averaging .85 in the scale development sample, .84 in the student validation sample, and even .83 in the much older community validation sample.

- The scale development sample consisted of, 433 undergraduate students enrolled in psychology courses at a public university in California. Most participants were in their early 20s. The participants were diverse in terms of ethnicity: 31% were White/Caucasian, 50% were Asian/Asian-American, 8% were Hispanic/Latino, 2% were Black/African-American, and 9% were of another ethnicity. All participants completed the 462-item version of the CPI.
- The student validation sample consisted of 396 undergraduate psychology students attending the same university as members of the scale development sample. All members of this sample This sample was similar to the scale development sample in terms of age and ethnicity, 30% White/Caucasian, 46% Asian/Asian-American, 8% Hispanic/Latino, 2% Black/African-American, 14% of another ethnicity. They completed the same version of the CPI within the same time constraints.
- The community validation sample consisted of 520 adult residents of the Eugene-Springfield, Oregon area. The members of this sample were more heterogeneous from the other samples, in terms of gender, education, ethnicity, and age. They too completed CPI under the same circumstances as the other two sample groups.

== Critique of the test ==
=== Strengths ===
CPI focuses on measuring and understanding common interpersonal behaviors (e.g., self-control, dominance etc.) in the general population. Extreme scores on some of the scales provide important information on specific maladjustments an individual may be experiencing. Thus, it provides good coverage of information for the general population as compared to tests that are more pathologically oriented. CPI has generally straightforward and easily understood scale names, which makes it more user friendly for untrained professionals and test takers, for example. Besides that, the interpretation of the results may have more immediacy and relevancy to the test takers because the results relate to ongoing aspects of behaviors. In addition, CPI has been shown to be a useful tool in predicting long- and short-term behaviors (e.g., college attendance). The "folk concepts" used in CPI are found in many cultures and societies which makes CPI more adaptable to various cultures.

=== Weaknesses ===
CPI was not designed to predict unidimensional traits. Instead, the focus was on predicting interpersonal behaviors. Some Folk Concepts scales are substantially correlated with one another as they may be associated to the same underlying traits. Gough argued that if the Folk Concepts are correlated in the minds of the general population, the CPI scales should be similarly correlated. As a result, CPI fails to provide a parsimonious and theory-oriented description of the normal personality, which is one of its major criticisms. There is also a lack of theoretical justification of the criteria used in developing the Folk Concepts and Special Purpose scales. It is unclear as to why some scales (e.g., dominance) are more basic and receive the status as "folk concepts" whereas others are labeled as "special purpose" (e.g., anxiety). In addition, CPI was designed to be an open system, which means that new scales can be added into the existing set of scales if a new criterion is to be predicted. With the lack of theoretical basis, there could be an infinite number of criteria to be predicted and these scales may be empirically redundant and lack clear psychological meanings.

Another criticism of the CPI is that its norm samples are not representative of the general population, particularly because adults working in professional occupations are underrepresented in the norm samples. Approximately 50% of the sample is composed of high school students and 16.7% of the sample are undergraduate students. Thus, the profiles forms used are more suited for evaluations of younger respondents. As a rule, clinicians also need to consider various factors such as life situation, reason for assessment, and overall pattern of scale elevation during result interpretation. This is because biased response from an individual may cause a single scale elevation which may not be meaningful if interpreted in isolation.

== See also ==
- F-scale (personality test)
