= Erich Adickes =

German philosopher (1866–1928)

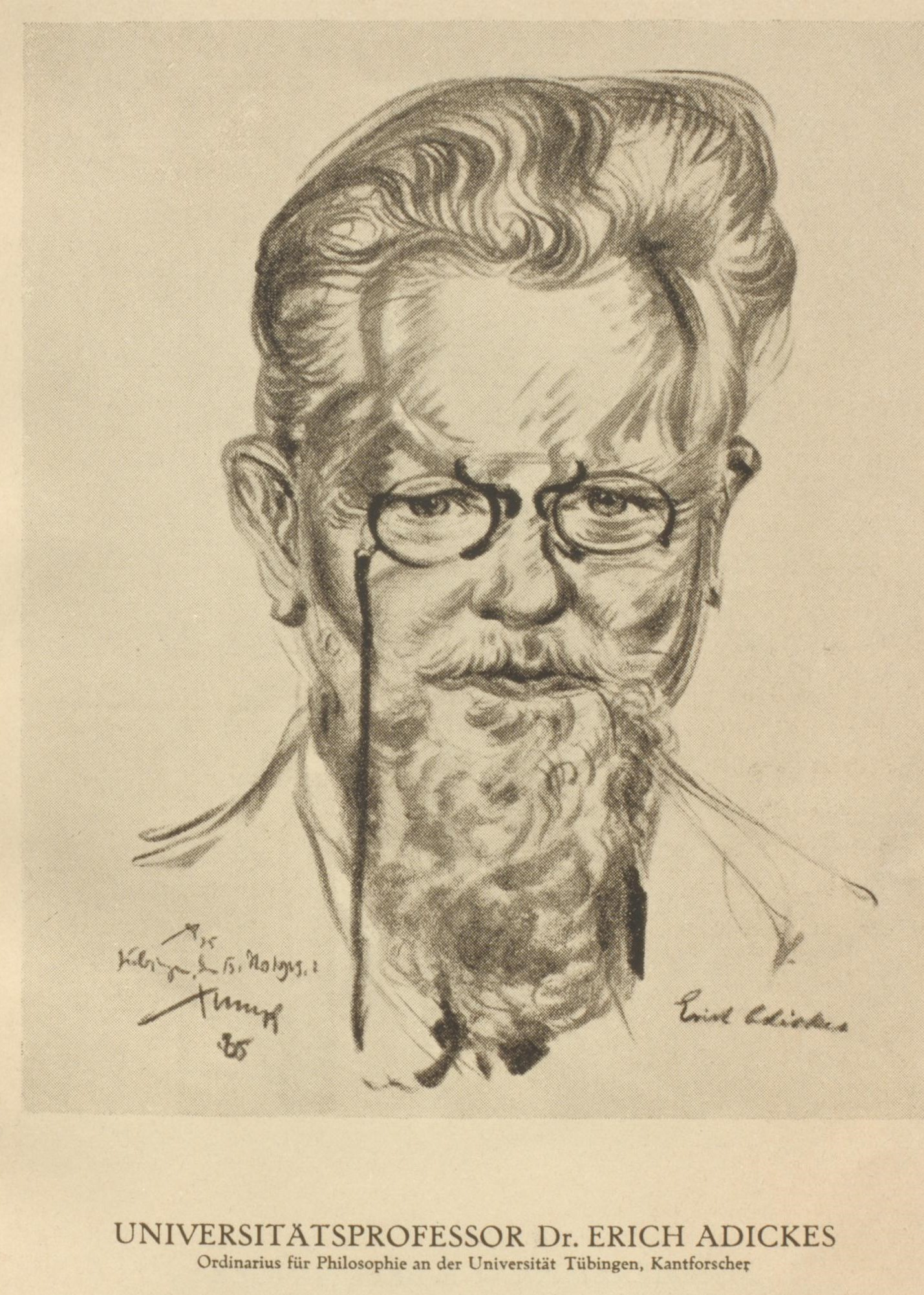
Erich Adickes

Erich Adickes (German: [ˈadɪkəs]; 29 June 1866, Lesum – 8 July 1928, Tübingen) was a German philosopher who wrote many important works on Immanuel Kant (1724–1804) and the Kantian philosophy. Adickes was a critical idealist.

== Career ==
Adickes studied theology, philosophy, and history at Tübingen, then at Berlin under Friedrich Paulsen (1846–1908), graduating Dr. Phil. with a dissertation titled Kants Systematik als systembildender Factor (Berlin: Mayer & Müller, 1887). Habilitating at Kiel in 1895, he became a full professor there in 1898. In 1902 he moved to Münster as full professor, then in 1904 succeeded Christoph von Sigwart (1830–1904) at Tübingen.

Adickes was intimately familiar with Kant's Nachlass, and exhibited extraordinary scholarship in his contributions to vols. 14–19 of Kant's gesammelte Schriften. In his Einleitung in die Abtheilung des handschriftlichen Nachlasses (in Kant Gesammelte Schriften, vol XIV, S. XV-LXII, 1925), he tried to date the Reflexionen, but the result is controversial.

Another important work written by Adickes is entitled German Kantian Bibliography - Writings by and on Kant which have appeared in Germany up to the end of 1887 (Boston: Ginn & Company, 1896) ( Note: This bibliography closes with the year 1804, the date of Kant's death, and does not extend to 1887 as stated in the title of the work.)

An opponent of Ernst Haeckel (1834–1919), Adickes in his Kant contra Haeckel: Erkenntnistheorie gegen naturwissenschaftlichen Dogmatismus (Berlin: Reuther & Reichard, 1901) wrote: "I have no more belief than he in a personal extra-mundane God, a creation of the world by him, or an immaterial soul separated from the body."

Adickes is also known for introducing, in 1907, his concept of Four World-Views: Dogmatic (or Doctrinaire), Agnostic (or skeptical), Traditional, and Innovative, which would help shape personality theory in the 20th century.
