= Ernst Kretschmer =

German psychchiatrist

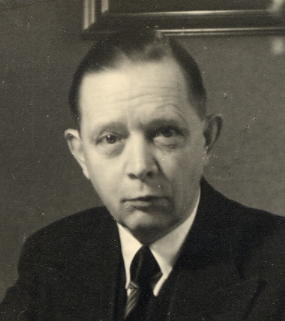
- Ernst Kretschmer
- Born: 8 October 1888; Wüstenrot, German Empire
- Died: 8 February 1964 (aged 75); Tübingen, West Germany
- Known for: Typology
- Scientific career
- Fields: Psychiatry
- Workplaces: Marburg University

Ernst Kretschmer (8 October 1888 – 8 February 1964) was a German psychiatrist who researched the human constitution and established a typology.

== Life ==
Kretschmer was born in Wüstenrot near Heilbronn. He attended Cannstatt Gymnasium, one of the oldest Latin schools in Stuttgart area. From 1906 to 1912 he studied theology, medicine, and philosophy at the universities of Tübingen, Munich and Hamburg. From 1913 he was assistant of Robert Gaupp in Tübingen, where he received his habilitation in 1918. He continued as assistant medical director until 1926. exactly.

In 1926 he became the director of the psychiatric clinic at Marburg University.

Kretschmer was a founding member of the International General Medical Society for Psychotherapy (AÄGP) which was founded on 12 January 1927. He was the president of AÄGP from 1929. In 1933 he resigned from the AÄGP for political reasons.

After he resigned from the AÄGP, he started to support the SS and signed the "Vow of allegiance of the professors of the German universities and high-schools to Adolf Hitler and the National Socialistic state." (German: "Bekenntnis der Professoren an den deutschen Universitäten und Hochschulen zu Adolf Hitler und dem nationalsozialistischen Staat").

From 1946 until 1959, Kretschmer was the director of the psychiatric clinic of the University of Tübingen. He died, aged 75, in Tübingen.

== Scientific contributions ==
=== Persistent vegetative state and sensitive paranoia research ===
Kretschmer was the first to describe the persistent vegetative state which has also been called Kretschmer's syndrome. Another medical term coined after him is Kretschmer's sensitive paranoia. This classification has the merit of singling out "a type of paranoia that was unknown" prior to Kretschmer, and which "does not resemble the stereotypical image [...] of sthenic paranoia". Furthermore, between 1915 and 1921 he developed a differential diagnosis between schizophrenia and manic depression.

=== Types of physique ===
Kretschmer is also known for developing (in the first quarter of the 20th century) a classification system that can be seen as one of the earliest exponents of a constitutional (the total plan or philosophy on which something is constructed) approach. He based his classification system on four main body-types:

- a) asthenic (thin, small, weak)
- b) athletic (muscular, large–boned)
- c) pyknic (stocky, fat)
- d) dysplastic (unproportionate body)

The concept of two great psychopathological types of manic-depressive or 'circular' insanity and dementia praecox (i. e. schizophrenia) was developed by Emil Kraepelin (1856–1926).

Kretschmer associated each of his body types with certain personality traits and, in a more extreme form, with different mental disorders. He wrote that there is only a weak relation between schizophrenia and pyknic body type on the one hand, and between Circulars (with the tendency to circular type of manic-depressive psychosis) and asthenics, athletics, and dysplastics on the other. Among people with schizophrenia, the asthenico–athletic types are very prevalent. Kretschmer believed that pyknic persons were friendly, interpersonally dependent, and gregarious. In a more extreme version of these traits, this would mean for example that the obese are predisposed toward manic-depressive illness. Thin types were associated with introversion and timidity. This was seen as a milder form of the negative symptoms exhibited by people with withdrawn schizophrenia. However, the idea of the association of body types with personality traits is no longer influential in personality psychology.

==== Asthenic type ====
The essential characteristic of the asthenic type, in Kretschmer's words, is "a deficiency in thickness combined with an average unlessened length". The deficiency is present in all parts of body: muscle, bone, neck, face, trunk, extremities, and in all the tissues (skin, bone, fat, muscles and vessel system). The average weight as well as the other body measurements are below the general value for males.

An asthenic man would be lean and narrowly built, with narrow shoulders, thin muscles, delicately boned hands, and a narrow, long, flat chest, on which one can usually see the ribs.

Asthenic females are not only thin, but also have a short height. In their general appearance they are the same as asthenic men.

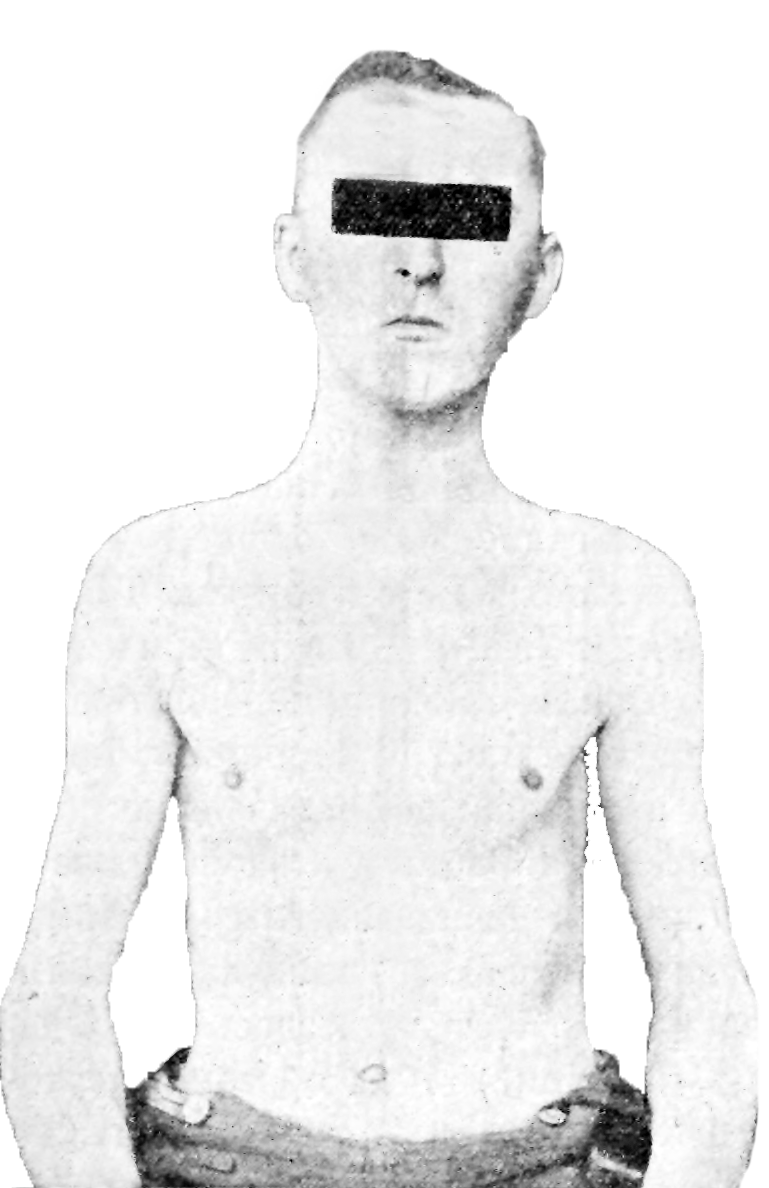
Asthenic type. A frontal portrait. Schizoid psychopath (schizoid personality disorder).

Principal average measurements of asthenic type
	Men	Women
Height (cm)	168.4	153.8
Weight (kg)	50.5	32.8
Width of shoulders (cm)	44.4	35.5
Chest (cm)	84.1	77.7
Stomach (cm)	74.1	67.7
Hips (cm)	84.7	82.2
Forearm (circum.; cm)	23.5	20.4
Hand (circum.; cm)	19.7	18.0
Calf (circum.; cm)	З0.0	27.7
Length of leg	89.4	79.2

==== Athletic type ====
Kretschmer's male athletic type is characterized by the strong development of the musculature, skeleton, and skin.

We have, therefore, in the clearest cases the following general impression: a middle-sized to tall man, with a superb chest, wide projecting shoulders ("particularly the hypertrophied shoulders" as Kretschmer said), firm stomach, magnificent legs. The expression "hypertrophied" means a development which oversteps the average, not in the sense of a pathological disturbance.

The athletic type among females corresponds to the male form. The certain characteristic deviation is the development of fat, it's rich, but not electively abnormal as with pyknics. Besides these athletic-type women with feminine rounded figures, there are also those women who have outstanding musculature in body and face. In many cases, athletic-type women are actually masculine in muscle relief.

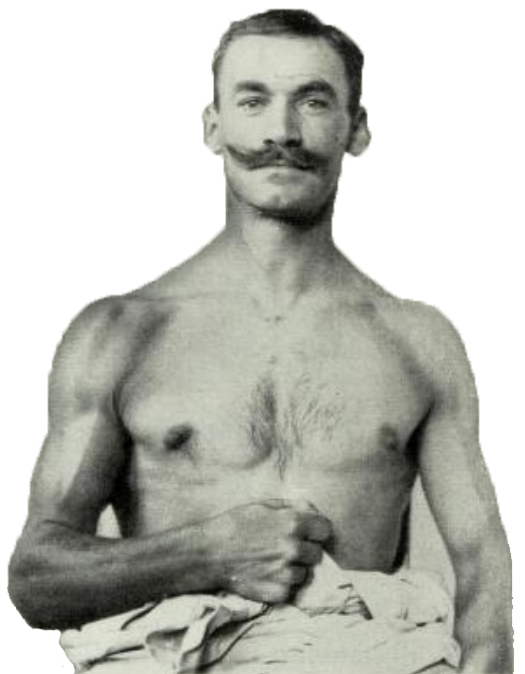
Athletic type with schizophrenia. A frontal portrait.

Principal average measurements of athletic type
	Men	Women
Height (cm)	170.0	163.1
Weight (kg)	62.9	61.7
Width of shoulders (cm)	39.1	37.4
Chest (cm)	91.7	86.0
Stomach (cm)	79.6	95.8
Forearm (circum.; cm)	91.5	24.2
Hand (circum.; cm)	21.7	20.0
Calf (circum.; cm)	33.1	31.7
Length of leg	90.9	85.0

==== Pyknic type ====
Kretschmer's pyknic type is characterized by the peripheral development of the body cavities (breast, head, and stomach), and a tendency to a distribution of fat about the torso. They also have a more graceful construction of the motor apparatus (limbs and shoulders).

The characteristics of the well-developed cases include: rounded figure, middle height, a soft broad face on a short massive neck, sitting between the shoulders, shoulders are not broad; soft, rounded, and displaying little muscle relief limbs, the hands soft, rather wide and short.

The pyknic type tends emphatically to a covering of fat. The obesity of the pyknic is restricted within moderate limits for the most part. The female pyknics' covering of fat is more strongly concentrated over the hips and chest.

The ratio of chest to shoulder of the female pyknics is the same as in the male pyknics.

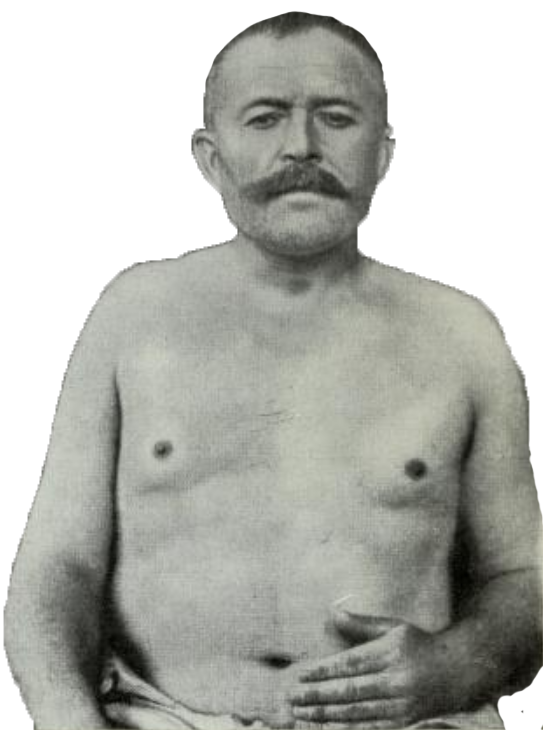
Pyknic type. A frontal portrait. Circular.

Principal average measurements of pyknic type
	Men	Women
Height (cm)	167.8	156.5
Weight (kg)	68.0	56.3
Width of shoulders (cm)	36.9	34.3
Chest (cm)	94.5	86.0
Stomach (cm)	88.8	78.7
Hips (cm)	92.0	94.2
Forearm (circum.; cm)	25.5	22.4
Hand (circum.; cm)	20.7	18.6
Calf (circum.; cm)	33.2	31.2
Length of leg	87.4	80.5

=== Distribution of the body types among the schizophrenics and circulars ===
Physical and psychic dispositions
						Circular	Schizophrenics
Asthenic	•	•	•	•	•	4	81
Athletic	•	•	•	•	•	3	31
Asthenico–athletic mixed	•	•	•	•	•	2	11
Pyknic	•	•	•	•	•	58	2
Pyknic mixture	•	•	•	•	•	14	3
Dysplastic	•	•	•	•	•	—	34
Deformed and uncataloguable forms	•	•	•	•	•	4	13
					Total	85	175

=== The temperaments ===
Kretschmer divided the temperaments into the two "constitutional groups": schizothymic, which contain a "psychæsthetic proportion" between sensitive and cold poles, and cyclothymes which contain a "diathetic" proportion between raised (happy) and sad. The modern term for light version of 'circular' insanity is cyclothymia. Psychic tempo of schizothymic people is between unstable and tenacious and they have alternation mode of feeling and thought, and cyclothymes psychic tempo is between mobile and comfortable. Schizothymic's psychomotility is often inadequate to stimulus: inhibited, restrained, lamed, stiff, etc., and psychomotility of cyclothymes is adequate to stimulus and natural. Cyclothymes are often pyknics, schizothymes – athletic, asthenic, dysplastic, and their mixtures.

The Schizoids consist of the hyperæsthetic (sensitive) and anæsthetic (cold) characters.

== Works ==
- Wahnbildung und manisch-depressiver Symptomenkomplexe, Berlin, (1914, dissertation) (development of delusion and manic-depressive symptom complex)
- Der sensitive Beziehungswahn, Berlin (1918), 2. Aufl. Berlin (1927), habilitation) (the sensitive relative delusion)
- Physique and Character (International Library of Psychology) (1931), Routledge, ISBN 0-415-21060-7
- Medizinische Psychologie, (1922) (medical psychology)
- Hysteria, Reflex, and Instinct, Leipzig (1923) Greenwood, ISBN 0-8371-5754-4
- Die Veranlagung zu seelischen Störungen, mit Ferdinand Adalbert Kehrer (1883–1966), Berlin (1924) (the disposition for psychic disturbances)
- Störungen des Gefühlslebens, Temperamente, Handbuch der Geisteskrankheiten. Band 1. Berlin (1928) (psychic disturbances and temperaments)
- The Psychology of Men of Genius (International Library of Psychology), Berlin (1929), Routledge, ISBN 0-415-21061-5
- Das apallische Syndrom, in Ztschr. Neurol. Psychiat, 169,576-579 (1940) (the apallic syndrome)
- Psychotherapeuthische Studien, Stuttgart (1949) (psychotherapeutic studies)
- Robert Gaupp zum Gedächtnis, Deutsche medizinische Wochenschrift, Stuttgart (1953) 78: 1713. (in memory of Robert Gaupp)
- Gestufte Aktivhypnose - Zweigleisige Standardmethode, In: V. E. Frankl, V.v. Gebsattel and J.H. Schultz, Hrsg.: Handbuch der Neurosenlehre und Psychotherapie, Band IV, pp. 130–141. Urban & Schwarzenberg, München-Berlin (1959)
- Gestalten und Gedanken (1963) (characters and thoughts)

== See also ==
- Posture (psychology)
- Eugène Minkowski
