= Dressing by body type in women =

Dressing by body type is the practice of wearing clothing that accentuates and fits one's body type or shape in order to look one's best. Women's bodies have been classified and labeled by different researchers, and some have used methods to identify how to dress based on these classifications. Some of this research has been criticized and discredited.

Women's fashion has evolved throughout history, and body types have both influenced and been influenced by popular styles and garments of the era.

== Body types ==
=== Sheldon's somatotypes ===
In the 1940s, American psychologist William Herbert Sheldon theorized a relationship between body shape and personality. He categorized people into three somatotypes, meaning body type. These are ectomorphs, endomorphs, and mesomorphs. Ectomorph refers to bodies that are lean and thin. Endomorphs refer to round and soft bodies, and mesomorphs refer to muscular bodies. Sheldon's theories that personality type could be predicted based on these groups was discredited, though his work is viewed as some of the first and most significant in body type classification.

=== Women's body shape comparisons ===
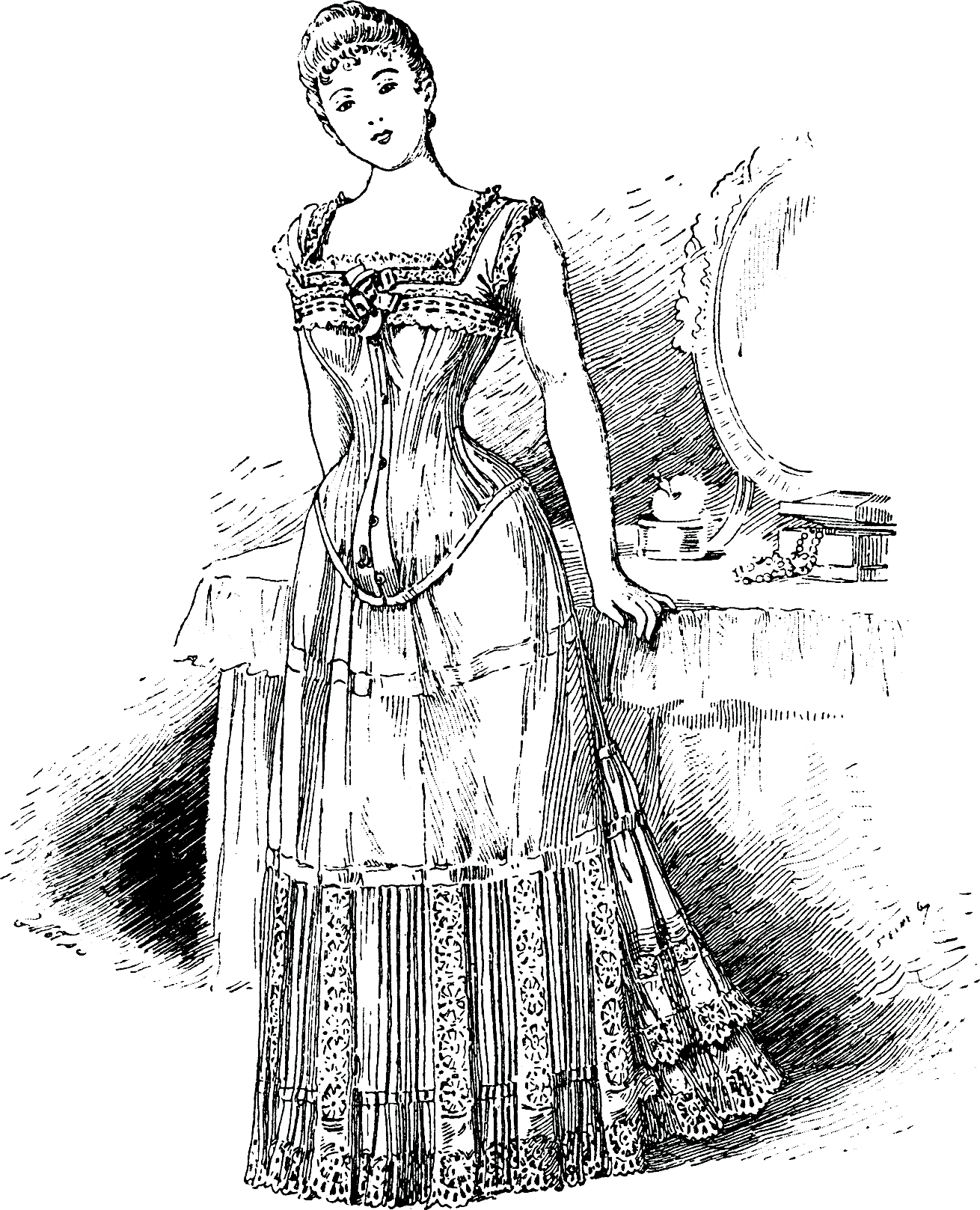
"Hourglass" figure achieved by use of a corset

Some female body shapes have been labeled as "rectangle", "pear", "apple", and "hourglass". A rectangle body shape is straight, wherein the circumference of one's chest and hips are similar in size, with little or no appearance of a waist. Pear- or "spoon"-shaped bodies have hip circumferences larger than that of the chest. Apple body shapes are the opposite of pear shapes, with the chest circumference being larger than the hip circumference. Hourglass shapes have a defined waist with similar hip and chest circumferences.

=== Kibbe method ===
David Kibbe, an American stylist, identified 13 "image identities", or body types, in his book Metamorphosis, published in 1987. These 13 body types fall into five categories which make up the Kibbe method: "dramatics", "classics", "naturals", "gamines", and "romantics". These groups fall into either "yin" or "yang" categories, with yang referring to angular features and yin referring to softer features. The Kibbe method resurfaced in popularity in the 2020s with a large following on social media. His concepts aimed to inform individuals about which silhouettes may be the most flattering given their body type.

These are not the only body type classifications that exist for women's bodies and body shapes in general.

== History of fashion and body type ==
Women have historically dressed for many reasons, including cultural and socioeconomic ones. Ancient Greeks and Romans aimed to follow the natural lines and form of the body, while more modern fashion has adjusted bodies to fit popular silhouettes. William Sheldon's research on somatotypes normalized body type classification, and women are exposed to this phenomenon in society and popular culture. His classification system also persists in the bodybuilding community.

=== 1800s ===
In 1840s France, gowns with long, puffy sleeves, or leg-o'-mutton sleeves, and tight waistlines were thought to accentuate femininity by creating a triangular shape flowing downward from shoulders to waist. The turn of the century saw more structure in garments, moving away from the shape of the body. Petticoats and layers of fabric were added to skirts, creating space between the skirt and the legs, adding weight to the garment and, therefore, to the appearance of the woman's hips.

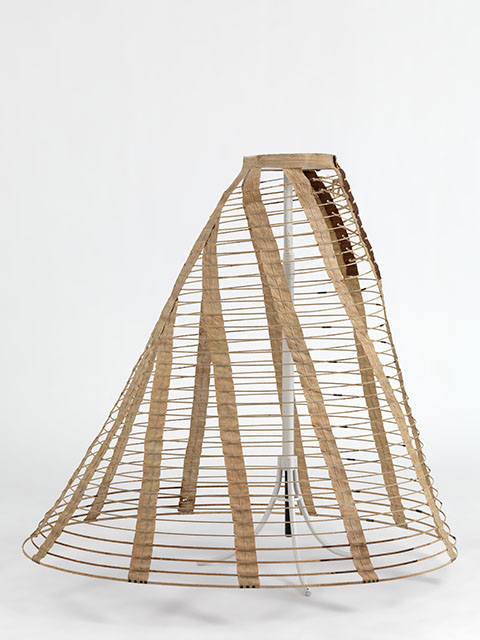
Cage crinoline underskirt

The invention of the cage crinoline in the 1850s removed the need for multiple layers of petticoats but added many logistical impediments in terms of sitting and moving around with ease.

Women's fashion was informed not by the female body but by fashionable undergarments of the time. Wearing multiple restrictive garments like corsets, petticoats, and crinolines was normal, and many individuals believed that such garments were negatively affecting the wearer's health and were symbolic of women's oppression. The nineteenth and twentieth centuries saw a desire among women to dress more practically, with clothing that permitted more activity in society.

=== 1900s ===
By the 1950s, slacks were becoming acceptable in womenswear in the United States, and the 1960s saw more progress toward casual dress for women.

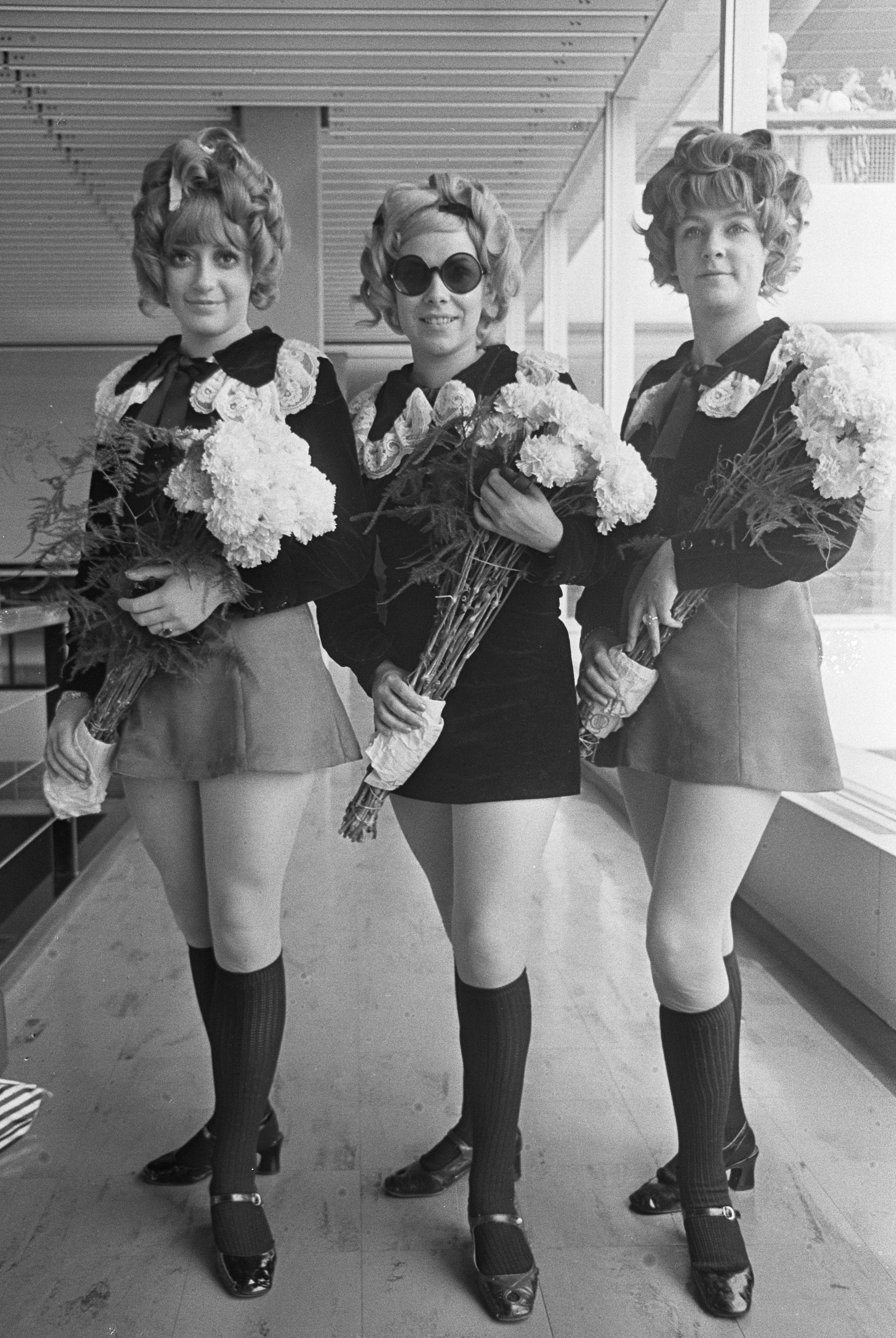
The miniskirt

Women in the 1960s trended toward playfulness and agency in their style, drifting away from the norm of designers dictating what women wore. The miniskirt and mini-dress highlighted the rebellious culture of this decade.

The 1980s brought sportswear and comfort into high fashion; women's bodies were becoming accounted for in design, rather than designers expecting women's bodies to change to fit the popular style.

=== Modern era ===
Cultural norms and fashion expectations have evolved over centuries. Modern women have experienced dressing by body type with the creation of body type classifications and the rise of social media.

The 2010s saw growth in fitness culture. The popular style became athleisure, or workout gear worn as a fashion statement rather than as intentional workout clothing.

Social media influencers became the norm for advertising fashion trends, largely gaining traction on Instagram.

== Examples in popular culture ==
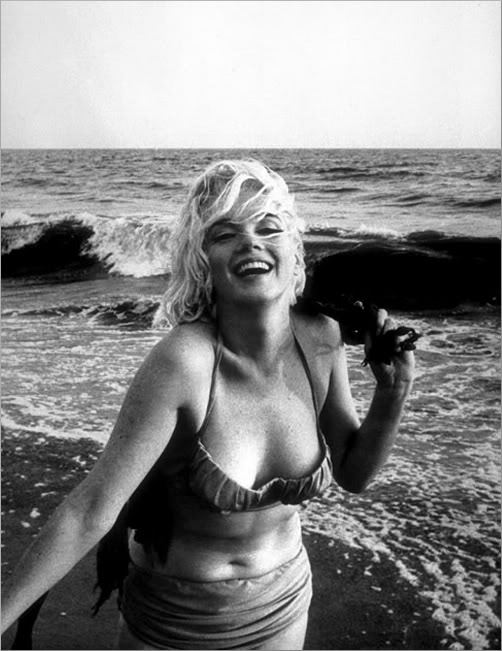
Marilyn Monroe as a demonstration of "yin" Kibbe type with softer features

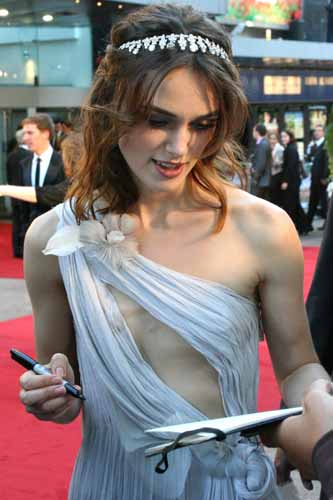
Keira Knightley as an example of "yang" Kibbe type with sharper features

Keira Knightley exemplifies more "yang" features in the Kibbe method, while Marilyn Monroe exemplifies more "yin" features. In the Kibbe system, yin is associated with curved lines, round edges, flowing silhouettes, hourglass figures, and fitted waists, while yang is associated with strong vertical lines, sharp edges, stiff smooth silhouettes, elongated outlines, and geometric shapes.

== Criticisms ==
=== Sheldon ===
William Sheldon used unorthodox and controversial methods of collecting subjects' images to research his theories. He photographed nude college students who falsely believed the photos were for correcting their posture. He postulated a connection between somatotypes and personality traits, theorizing he could predict certain patterns from an individual's body type, known as constitutional psychology. His findings were widely discredited among the scientific community, in part due to his research methods.

His work contained racist views, and his assumptions about personality based on body type persist today in criminal justice systems, where people with muscular body types can be seen as more aggressive, and in professional settings where overweight individuals can be deemed lazy.

=== Media influence ===
Trends in popular fashion magazines portray a dramatic decrease in body size for female models alongside an increase in full-body portrayals of women's bodies.

The fashion industry has been influenced by body-positive and body shape inclusivity movements to include a variety of body types in fashion models. Girls may be more influenced to purchase garments modeled by thin women than curvy women.

== See also ==
- Body image
- Hourglass figure
- Female body shape
- Body shape
- Media depictions of body shape
- Thin ideal
- Plus-size clothing
