= Akira Gomi =

Japanese photographer

Akira Gomi (五味 彬, Gomi Akira; born 1953) is a Japanese photographer whose work focuses on beauty across racial lines. His work is in the style of Laurie Toby Edison.

== Education ==
Gomi graduated Nihon University, Dept. of Photography in 1976. He studied with Laurence Sackman and Michel Benton and then returned to Japan in 1983.

== Photography career ==
Gomi established a company in 1993 called Digitalogue which produces multimedia photography works. At that time, he began to publish a series of books on photos of women of different races, with an emphasis on anatomical differences, in the style of William Herbert Sheldon's Ivy League nude posture photos.

In 1998, his work focused on the subject of loose socks.

== Publications ==
- Nude of J. (with Toni Meneguzzo) (1991)
- Americans 1.0, Los Angeles 1994 (1994) ISBN 978-4-89424-018-6
- Americans 1.0 Los Angeles (1994) CD-ROM
- Yellows 2.0 Tokyo 1993 (1994) CD-ROM
- Yellows 3.0 China 1994 (1994)
- Yellows Privacy (1994) CD-ROM
- Yellows Men (with Kaz Katayama) (1995) ISBN 4-89424-052-1
- Yellows: Contemporary Girls (1997) CD-ROM
- Americans 1.0 (1998) ISBN 978-4-82112-246-2
- Yellows 1.0 1991 (1999)

== See also ==
- Stealable Art Exhibition
