= Stealable Art Exhibition =

Art exhibition held in Tokyo

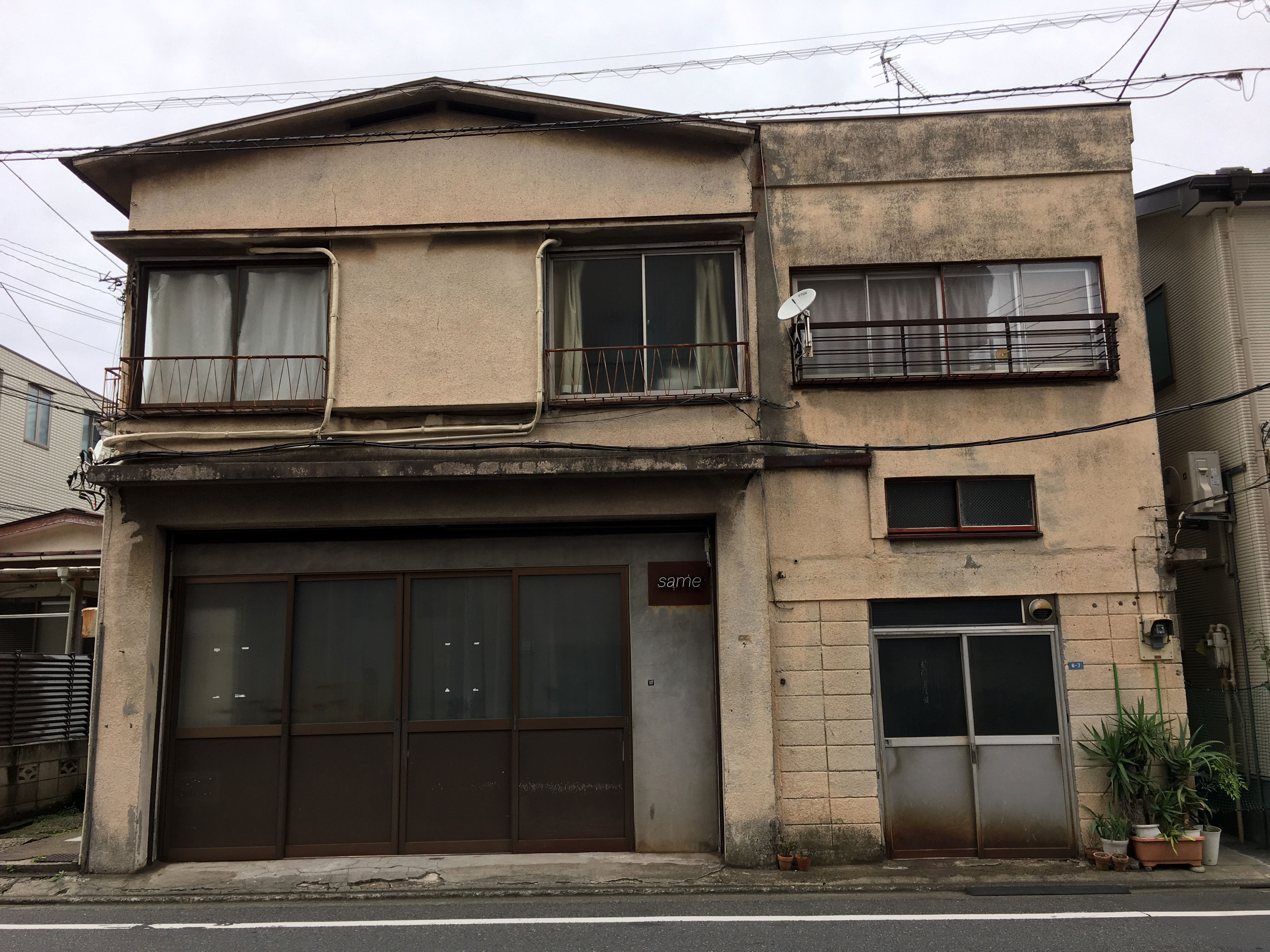
The venue "same gallery" (1st floor, left side)

Stealable Art Exhibition (Japanese: 盗めるアート展) was planned by art director Touta Hasegawa and held at the same gallery in Ebara, Shinagawa, Tokyo, on July 9, 2020. It was an experimental project in which the gallery where the works were exhibited was left unguarded day and night for 10 days, and visitors were free to "steal" any work they liked at any time. On the first day of the exhibition, about 200 people who had heard about the show crowded in front of the venue, and just before the opening time, they avalanched into the gallery and immediately took all 11 works, closing the exhibition almost instantly.

== Concepts ==
The general perception of artworks is that they are to be viewed from a distance in art museums and galleries. However, Hasegawa has long been interested in experiments that transform the distance and aspect between the artwork and the viewer. When the same gallery opened in March 2020, he held a "Bring Your Own Art" party as the opening event, where visitors could bring their own artworks and artifacts to decorate the walls. Hasegawa also wondered if there was another way to relate to works of art other than "seeing" or "buying" them. He then went on to launch this project called "Stealing." Hasegawa preferred documentaries about painting thieves. He even considered the theft of his work a sign of the author's status and, in a way, an honor.

The "Same Gallery" building, the venue of the exhibition, faces the street and has a structure that allows wide passage. When Hasegawa found this property, he and his staff were talking about how they could run the business like an unattended vegetable stand. The business model of "Book Road," a 24-hour unmanned used bookstore in Musashino City, was also an inspiration for this project.

The poster announcing the exhibition explained the purpose of the exhibition as follows,

When a work is exhibited as something that can be stolen, what kind of work does the artist exhibit? What happens to the relationship between the viewer and the work? We hope that this exhibition will provide an opportunity to rethink the state of contemporary art from a different angle, in a space where the existing relationship with the protected exhibition space of galleries and museums, which always clings to works of art, has been broken down.

In an interview before the exhibition, Hasegawa said that artworks themselves are not utilitarian and their value can be determined in any way according to the subjectivity of the recipient, in other words, they have relativity of value. Therefore, the thief of a painting steals the work because he "proactively" recognizes the value of the work, which is a different dimension from the immediate act of theft, such as stealing daily necessities. This project is "a cross between 'stealing' and art," and it is only possible because it is just the right balance.

=== Exhibitors ===
Hasegawa called on a wide range of "people who would be happy to have their works stolen", from established veterans to young artists,く and 11 contemporary artists and creators who agreed with the purpose of the project exhibited one work each. All but one of the works were new, and the artists offered to donate them almost free of charge.

Exhibitors include,

- Akira Gomi
- exonemo (エキソニモ)
- Gabin Ito (伊藤ガビン)
- Joji Nakamura (中村譲二)
- Naoki "SAND" Yamamoto
- Minori Murata (村田実莉, skydiving magazine)
- Masako Hirano (平野正子, skydiving magazine)
- Merge Majordan
- Nukeme (ヌケメ)
- yangO2 (やんツー)
- Kagami Foundation Correction (加賀美財団コレクション, Ken Kagami 加賀美健's pseudonym at this time)

Minori Murata exhibited her work "GODS AND MOM BELIEVE IN YOU." This work consists of approximately 150 fake credit cards with the title of the work printed on them, mixed with many wallets and Indian currency, and scattered on the floor. This work is based on the concept of "theft" that lurks in our lives, such as pickpocketing. Murata lived in India from October of the previous year and was inspired by its religious views. This is why she titled her work "God." The title of the work, inscribed on a false credit card, suggests that it is about resisting the temptation to steal under the gaze of God and the Mother.

The Kagami Foundation Collection exhibited the work "Untitled." The work was simply a piece of paper with the words "Stolen on the way to the gallery" handwritten on it in pen and pasted on the wall and was the result of "thinking about how to prevent it from being stolen because it would be too much of a pain to have it stolen.

Joji Nakamura exhibited his work "For Those Who Want to Steal Mona Lisa." It is a simple black-and-white sketch of Mona Lisa, and it offers visitors the experience of stealing that famous painting.

Merge Majordan exhibited his work "Self-Division." This cloth artwork has a deliberately cut line at the border and scissors on the floor directly below to allow multiple visitors to share the work.

Naoki "SAND" Yamamoto exhibited his work "Midnight Vandalist." This work consists of a daily calendar made of paper with the same illustration, and visitors can choose whether they tear off one sheet at a time and take it home, or take the whole booklet home by themselves.

Masako Hirano exhibited her work "Narcissi." When this work was listed on the marketplace Mercari, Hirano revealed that she offered to negotiate a lower price on the condition that she bear the shipping costs and send the work to her parents' house.

=== Initial Exhibition Policies ===
Eleven works will be exhibited in a gallery of approximately 40 square meters facing a residential street, and will be freely accessible 24 hours a day for 10 days starting at midnight on July 10, 2020. Surveillance cameras for relay and recording are installed. No other security personnel or equipment are placed there. Visitors can take home (steal) only one piece of artwork they like per group free of charge and without permission. The exhibition will be closed when all works are stolen, even during the exhibition period.

== On the day ==
This exhibition was originally scheduled to be held in April 2020 but was postponed due to the COVID-19. The announcement was made again in June after the voluntary curfew in Japan was lifted.

The announcement generated a huge response, especially on social networking sites, which became a lot of fun, with people asking for advice on how to steal.

Hasegawa sensed a strong response from the inquiries he received, and in a prior interview, he stated that "the desire for cultural events (due to the voluntary curfew) seems to be growing," and that he expected "all the works to be stolen in an hour or two."

The opening reception was held from 6:00 p.m. to 9:00 p.m. on July 9 to unveil the works before "Thief Time," which begins at midnight on July 10, the first day of the exhibition period. While paying attention to ventilation and admission restrictions, concerned parties and families with children viewed the works that were about to be stolen.

A few "thieves" began to gather here and there in front of the venue, having heard about the event through social networking sites. Some of them came from as far away as Hachioji City and Mitaka City with the intention of taking the first train home. Some enjoyed cosplaying in retro Japanese-style thieves. Most of those gathered were young people in their 20s and 30s. The crowd was chatting and laughing as they waited for the doors to open, all looking forward to the free distribution of rare items. They didn't seem confused.

As the opening time approached, the crowd in the narrow street in front of the venue swelled to about 200 people. Police were dispatched due to complaints from neighbors. Police used guide lights to direct traffic on the heavily congested surrounding streets starting around 11:30 p.m. The venue was located in the middle of a residential area, so the late-night hustle and bustle had to be avoided. The place became more crowded than expected and dangerous, so Hasegawa decided to move up the opening time by 20 minutes before any more people gathered. It opened abruptly for those gathered at about 11:35 p.m.

As the staff reached for the lights to prepare for the opening, one of the visitors stepped into the gallery. At that moment, the approximately 40-square-meter venue was packed with people. The site was filled with people pushing and shoving each other, some holding stolen works above their heads, some holding them to their chests and enduring the crowd, and others wading through the crowd to get their hands on a work of art. The thumping, violent noise that shook the gallery could be heard across the street.

All the works were taken away in about one minute. According to Hasegawa, the situation was not a riot. Some visitors played rock paper scissors to decide who would be the owner, as per the rules, and the atmosphere was not so grim that visitors were fighting each other. Many ran away to avoid having the work they had acquired. After about 10 minutes, the hall was closed. But even after midnight, the chaos continued. In the confusion that followed, a certain degree of moderation was evident among the visitors, as some lost items were delivered and others asked for the return of equipment that they had mistakenly brought home with them.

Immediately after the exhibition closed, a number of exhibited works were sold on the auction site Yahoo! Auctions or Mercari. The works were priced variously from 3,000 yen to 100,000 Japanese yen. The works on display were priced appropriately even though they did not have price tags at the venue. Forgeries were also exhibited that falsified the exhibits.

After the day dawned, Hasegawa explained and apologized on the official website for the confusion at the venue and in the surrounding area, saying, "This exhibition was not originally planned with the intention of causing such confusion, and I am ashamed to say that I could not have predicted what would happen on the day of the exhibition."

Some social networking site users commented that the whole event, from the commotion at the venue to the subsequent Mercalli sale festival, was like an art performance. And some ridiculed the auction site as the main venue for the exhibit. Some also pointed out the lack of foresight on the day of the event, saying that it was actually a nuisance to the neighbors and that it was more a matter of morals and courtesy than art.

== See also ==
- Prada Marfa
