= Posture (psychology) =

Aspect of nonverbal communication

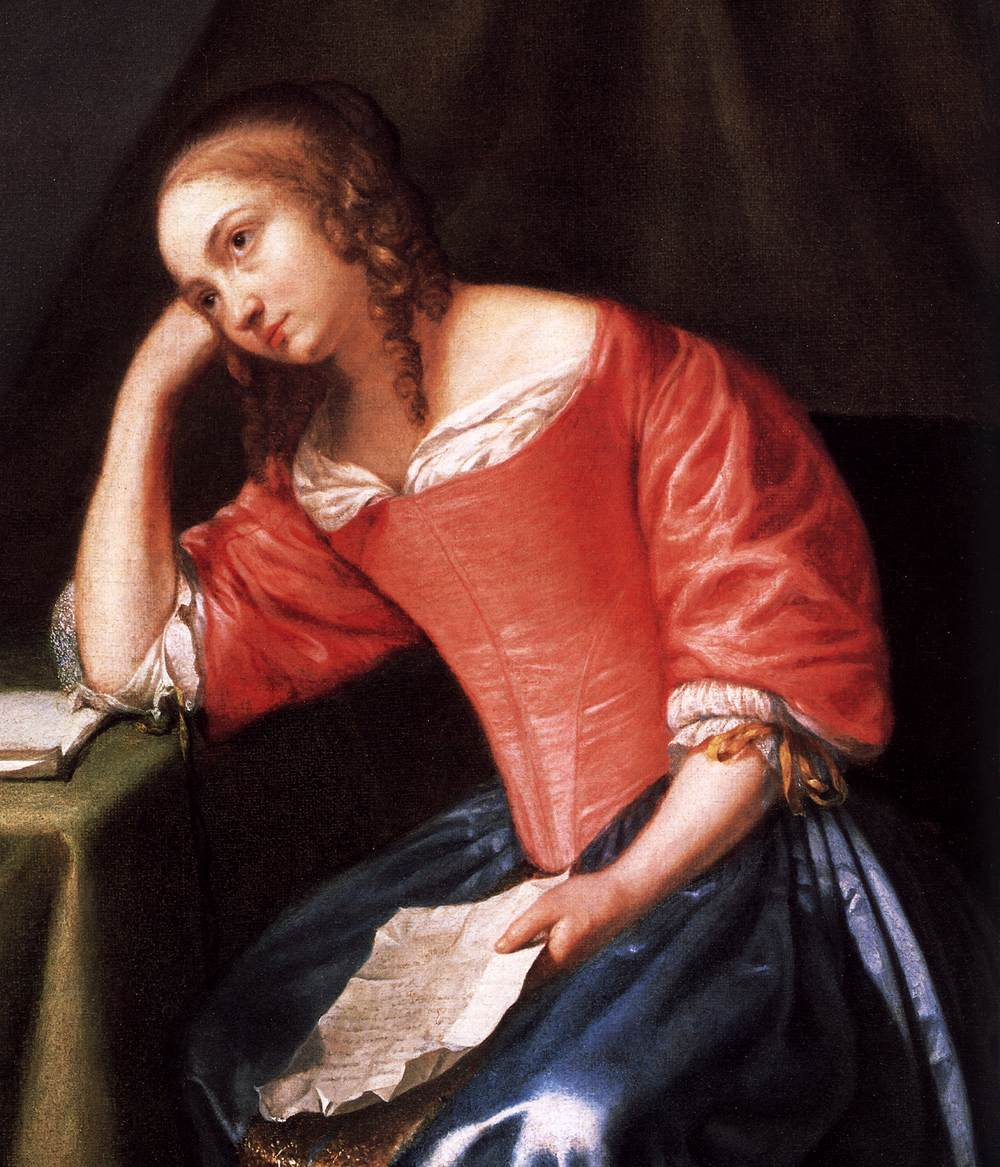
Young Girl Holding a Letter, circa 1665

In humans, posture can provide a significant amount of important information through nonverbal communication. Psychological studies have also demonstrated the effects of body posture on emotions. This research can be traced back to Charles Darwin's studies of emotion and movement in humans and animals. Currently, many studies have shown that certain patterns of body movements are indicative of specific emotions. Researchers studied sign language and found that even non-sign language users can determine emotions from only hand movements. Another example is the fact that anger is characterized by forward whole body movement. The theories that guide research in this field are the self-validation or perception theory and the embodied emotion theory.

- Self-validation theory is when a participant's posture has a significant effect on their self-evaluation of their emotions. An example of this is an experiment where participants had to think and then write positive qualities of themselves in a confident or doubtful posture. Participants then had to self-evaluate on how good a job candidate, interviewee, performer, and how satisfied they would be as an employee. Mood and confidence level were also measured. Results from this study proved in favor of the self-validation theory. Participants' attitudes in the confident but not doubtful posture significantly affected their self-reported attitudes. A similar study showed that participants who were placed in a hunched posture reported were more likely to feel stressed compared to participants who assumed a relaxed position.
- Embodied emotion theory is the idea that mental events can be represented by states of the body. In a study showing embodied emotion, participants were primed with concepts of pride and disappointment by a word generation task. Researchers hypothesized there would be an observable change in participants' posture based on the word they were primed with. This hypothesis was confirmed for the disappointment prime because participants were more likely to decrease in their vertical height or show slumping behavior.

== Common methods ==
Physical posture and emotion have been studied using two similar techniques. The first method involves the participant viewing videotaped actors performing certain actions and the second method involves having the participant sit in a certain posture and then self-reporting their emotions. In the first method, actors portray and record certain body movements. Participants must view the video and decipher the emotion they believe is being portrayed. In the second method, participants are told to assume a certain body posture and then must complete a survey on their current affective state. Other methods include using neuroscience techniques, such as fMRI's to determine how posture and emotions expressions can affect brain imaging. Another method that is growing in use involves using dancers as 'actors' and having participants observe and determine the emotion the dancer is conveying.

== Communication expressed ==
In humans, one of the means of communication is the posture of the body, in addition to facial expressions, personal distances, gestures and body movements. Posture conveys information about:

- Interpersonal relations
- Personality traits such as confidence, submissiveness, and openness.
- Social standing
- Current emotional states
- Characteristics of temperament according to the theory of Hippocrates, Kretschmer, and Sheldon.

== Analysis ==
The graph visualizes the possible correlation between posture and personality.

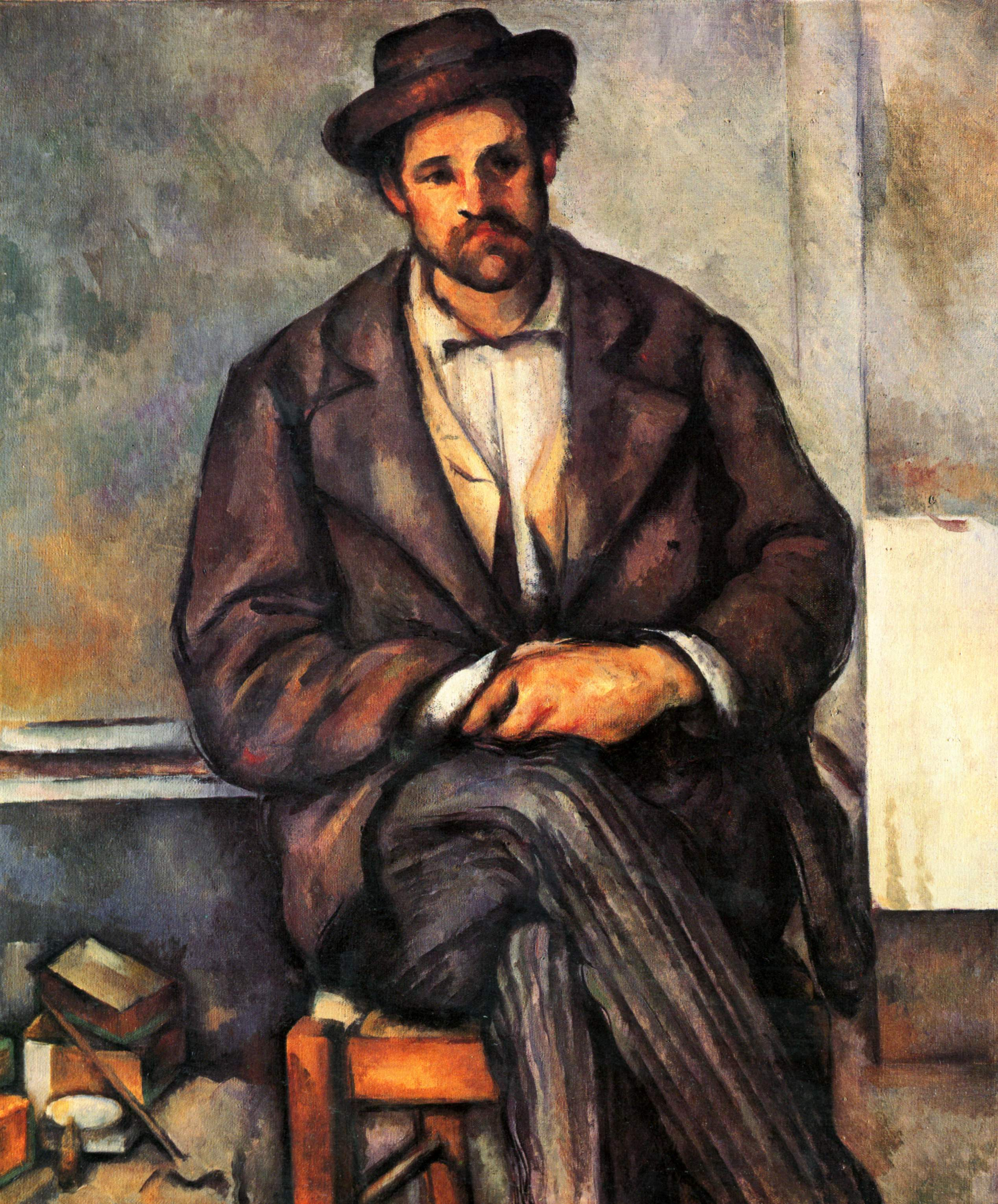
A portrait of Paul Cézanne exhibiting an example of closed posture.

Posture can signal both the enduring characteristics of a person (character, temperament, etc.), and his or her current emotions and attitudes. Therefore, posture can be considered in the context of a given situation, and independently of it.

=== Changing factors ===
Posture as information about the current state of a person's emotions and attitudes should be analyzed in the context of other messages, both verbal and nonverbal as well as that person's cultural and social norms.

==== Open and closed ====
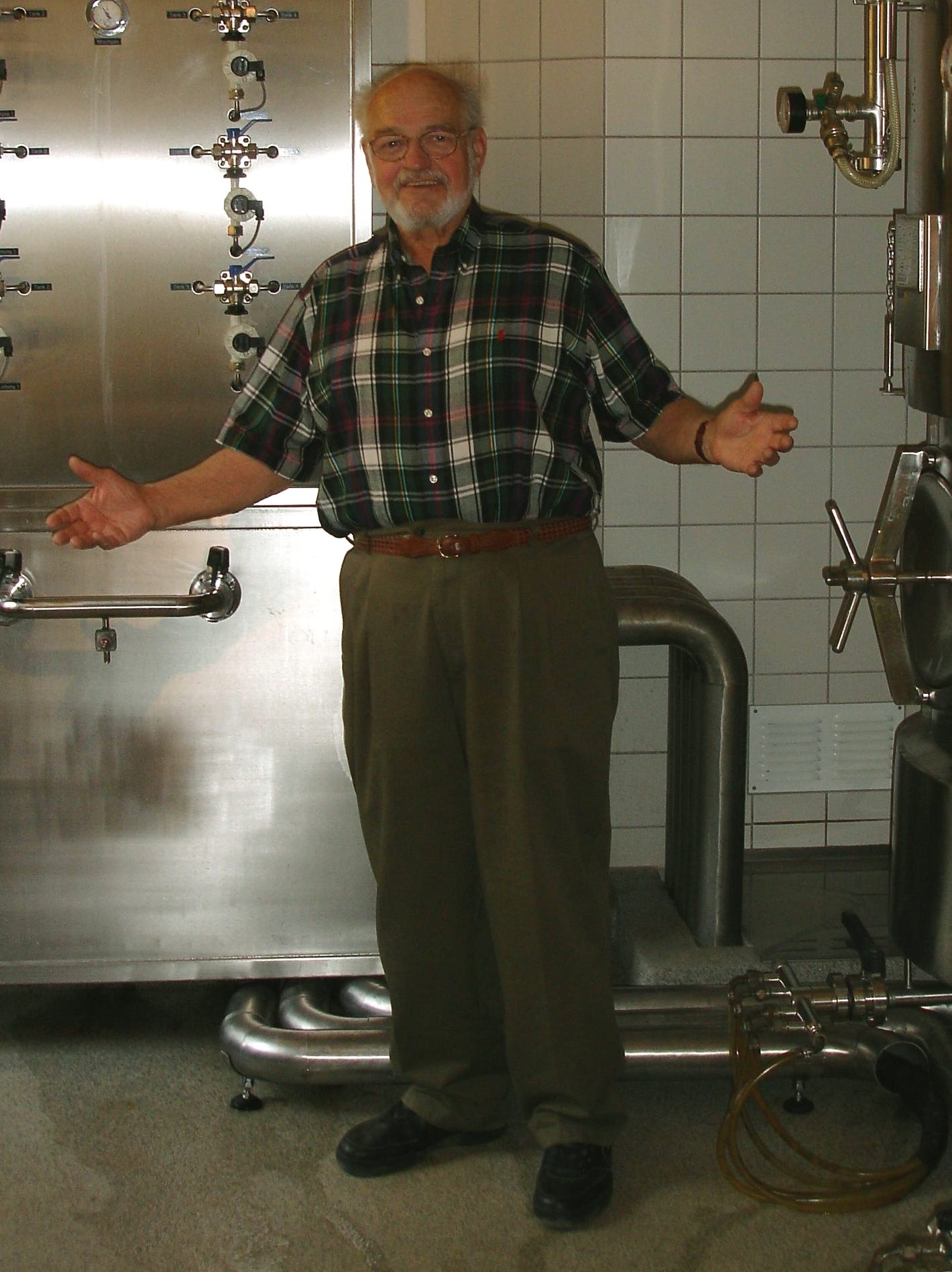
An example of open posture.

- Open posture is a posture in which the vulnerable parts of the body are exposed. The head is raised, the shirt may be unbuttoned at the neck, a bag is held on the shoulder or at the side. Open posture is often perceived as communicating a friendly and positive attitude. In an open posture the feet are spread and the head is straight. The palms are up and the hands and fingers are spread. Due to this friendly demeanor, research suggests that participants view counselors who use an open posture as more capable of providing guidance.
- Closed posture is a posture in which parts of the body most susceptible to trauma are obscured. These body parts are: throat, abdomen and genitals. Damage to the genitals prevents the transfer of their genes to future generations and is sometimes seen as being synonymous with death. Therefore, both humans and animals try to protect these vulnerable body parts from injury. In humans, certain behaviors may signal closed posture: Arms crossed on the chest or abdomen, hands clasped in front of the genitals, and crossing legs. Clothing may also signal closed posture: a buttoned suit, or a handbag or briefcase held in front of the person. Closed posture often gives the impression of detachment, disinterest, and hostility. Research has also shown that these behaviors usually convey unpleasant feelings. These feelings were evident when the participant had to observe the closed posture and when he or she was told to assume the posture.

An important element of closed or open posture of the body are the hands. Showing the palms of the hands can be a signal of open posture, especially if the hand is relaxed. Showing the back of the hand or clenching hands into fists may represent a closed posture. Hands clasped behind the back may also signal closed posture even though the front is exposed because it can give the impression of hiding something or resistance to closer contact.

Closed and open posture also apply when seated. Crossed legs and arms can signal closed posture. As stated before, leaning forward or showing the palms of the hands can signal open posture.

==== Interpersonal attitudes ====
Interpersonal attitudes are communicated through:

- Inclination of the body. During conversation, a person may lean slightly toward another person or tilt slightly away from them. This behavior is usually unconscious. An inclination towards can be an expression of sympathy and acceptance. Inclining away can signal dislike, disapproval, or a desire to end the conversation. Different inclinations of the head may carry similar meanings.
- Similarity. During the conversation, people have an unconscious tendency to imitate others' behavior. This happens when the conversation runs seamlessly and is enjoyable for both parties. This approximation of attitudes, gestures, and body movements can indicate the emergence of a bond and sympathy and is known as stereotyped behavior as defined by Edwin Ray Guthrie. Lack of synchronous behavior may lead to a sense that the contact is artificial, forced, or unpleasant.
- Orientation of the body. Usually people talk directed toward each other, but not squarely face to face, which can be indicative of a confrontational stance. In conversation, the participants' bodies are usually turned toward each other at an angle. When a person ignores someone else, they tend to ignore or avoid contact by showing the other person their side or back.
- Closed or Open posture.

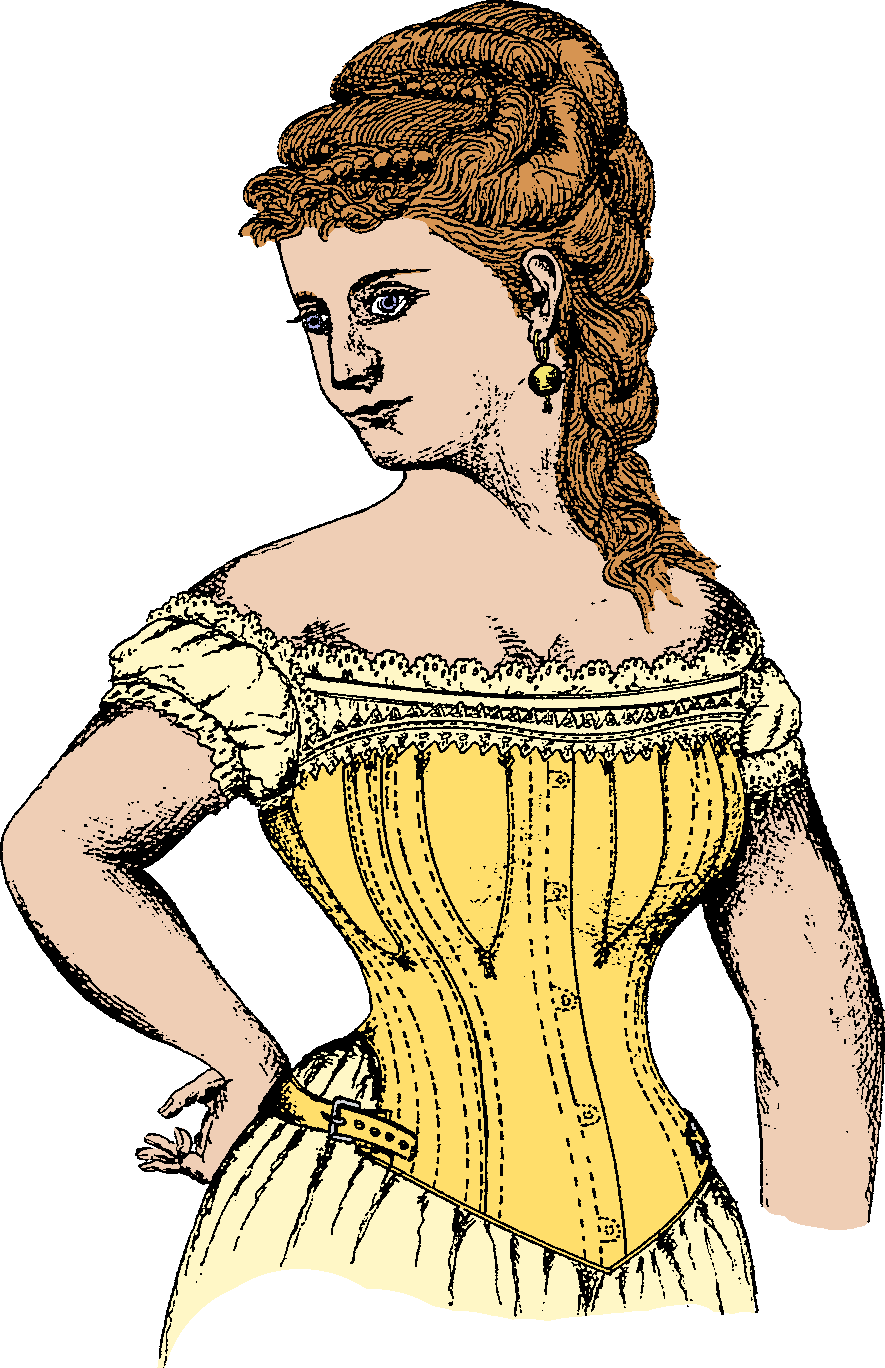
An example of a nonchalant posture

==== Posture communicating social standing ====
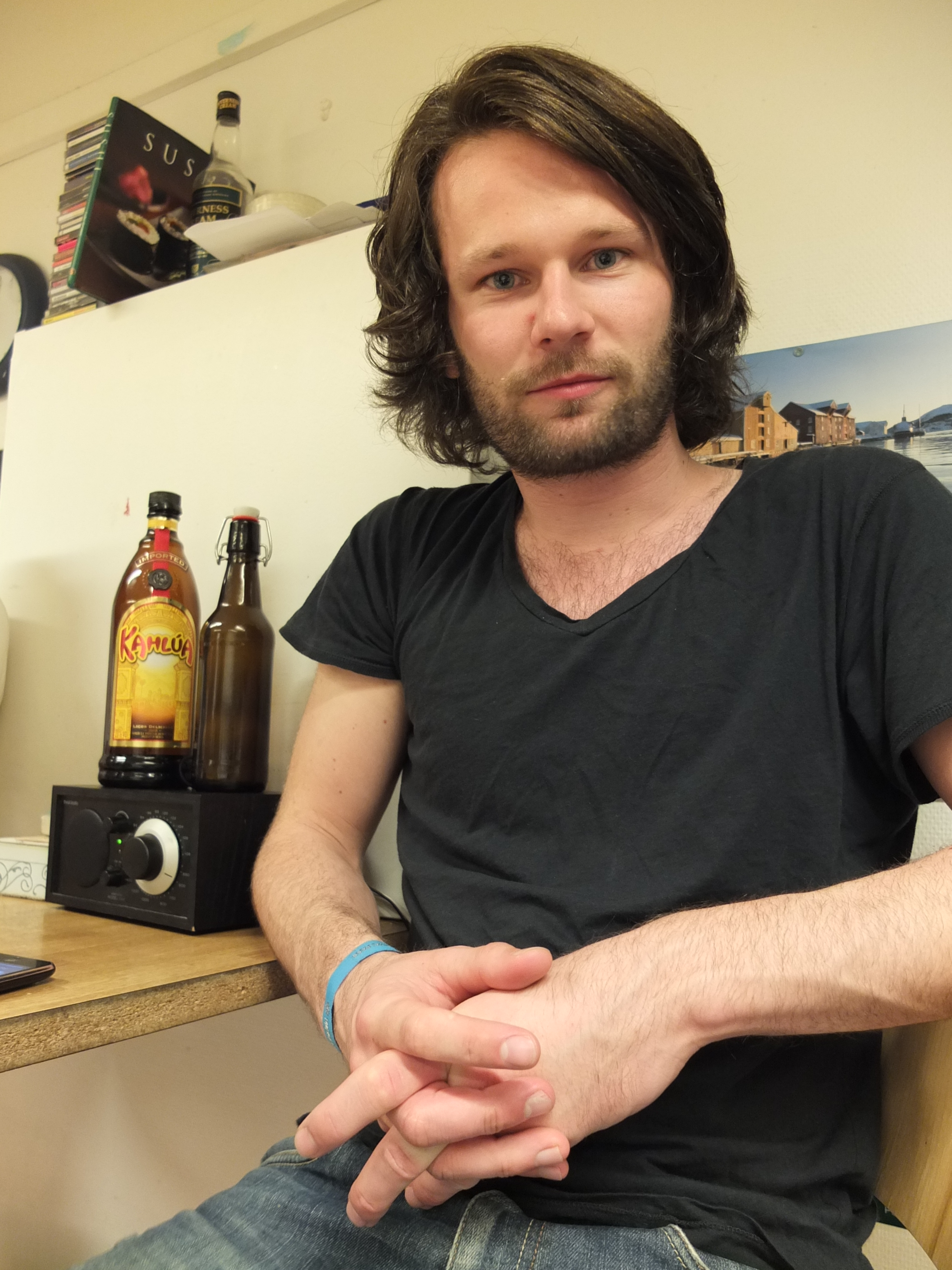
A man posing for camera

Posture can signal an individual's position in social hierarchy.

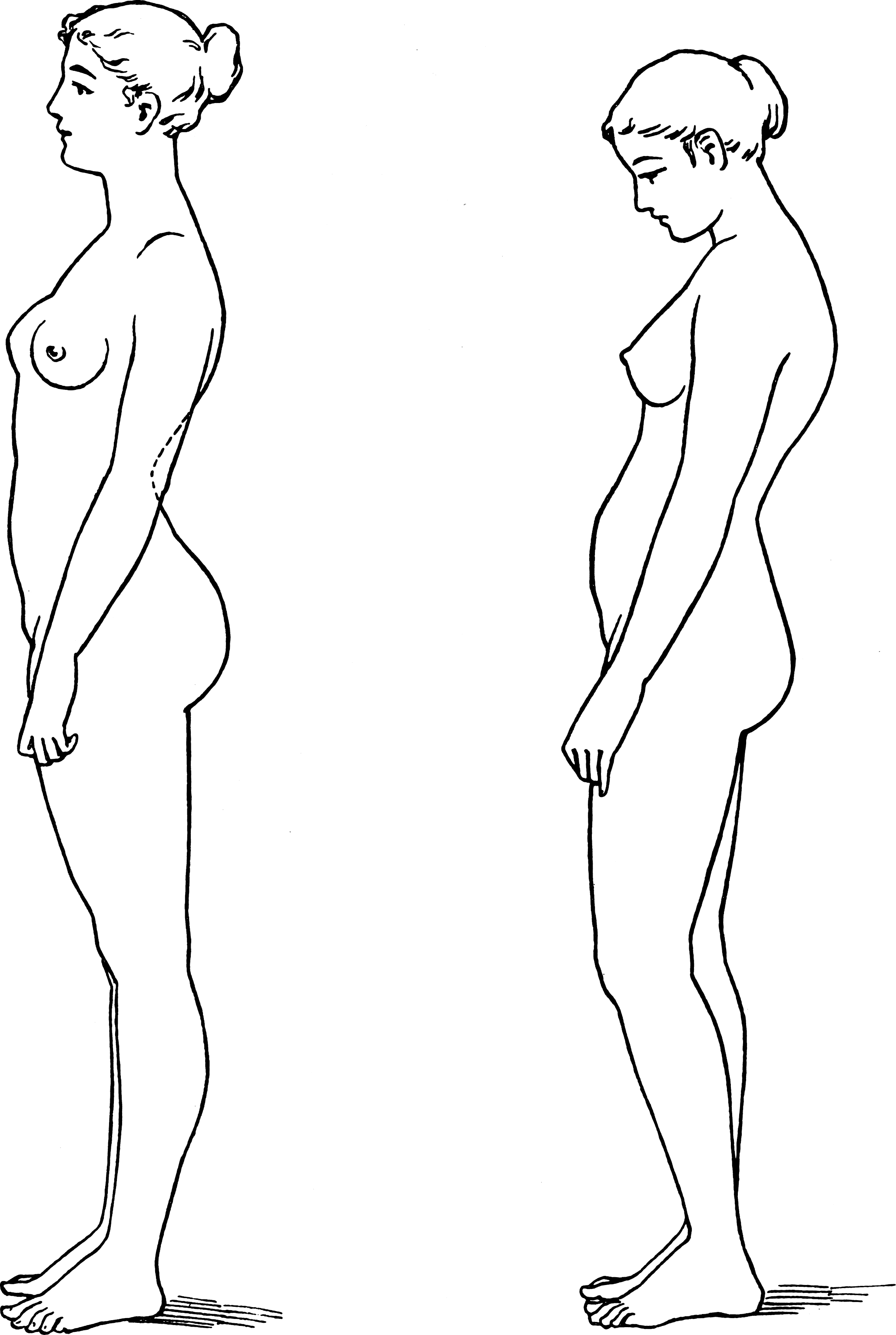
A comparison of two different postures. On the left is an example of a more energized attitude; on the right is an example of a depressed attitude.

- If two people of different social standings talk to each other, the person with a higher position usually takes a more relaxed attitude. Their posture may be unbalanced, relaxed, and may appear to be nonchalant. A person with a lower position often maintains symmetrical posture by placing both hands on their lap or at their sides.
- Typically, a person with higher status sits down and talks while sitting. A person of lower status may stand or they may remain standing until they are asked to sit.

==== Erect Posture and impact on mood and activity performance ====
In a 2018 study, published in the journal NeuroRegulation, Dr Erik Peper and team found that good posture significantly helped in securing better scores on mathematics test. It was reasoned that slouched posture shuts down people and hampers brain processing not allowing clear thinking. They concluded that erect posture helps people to perform under varying conditions of stress. It was noted that the improvement in performance might also be seen for people doing other activities such as musicians and athletes.

==== Wellbeing ====
Mood influences muscle tone, energy level, and one's internal sense of well-being. Thus, body posture can reveal a person's current state of mind. Anger, sadness, and disgust are by far the most recognized body postures that are indicative of emotions.

- Stress can affect posture subconsciously; a person under stress will often have a greater amount of muscle tension, and may also have shallow, clavicular breathing.
- Well-being affects posture by giving it a sense of energy and balance. A person's spine will be straight and the head raised.
- Malaise affects posture with a sense of tiredness. A person's shoulders may droop, and the head may be bowed down or tilted to the left or right.
- Confidence affects posture by the uprightness (or not) of one's body.

Popular literature has come to interpret postures according to the assumptions of psychoanalysis, thinking that actions such as crossing arms over the breasts or crossing legs would be a symptom of a sexual complex. These beliefs, however, have very limited support in systematic research and experimentation. It is more likely that this type of behavior reflects a certain style of self-presentation, rather than unconscious conflicts and complexes.

=== Stable factors ===
The term posture is also used to refer to the appearance of the body. In psychology, there are several concepts involving the appearance of the permanent characteristics of individuals. Some habitual positions may also reflect stable characteristics of an individual.

==== Nature ====
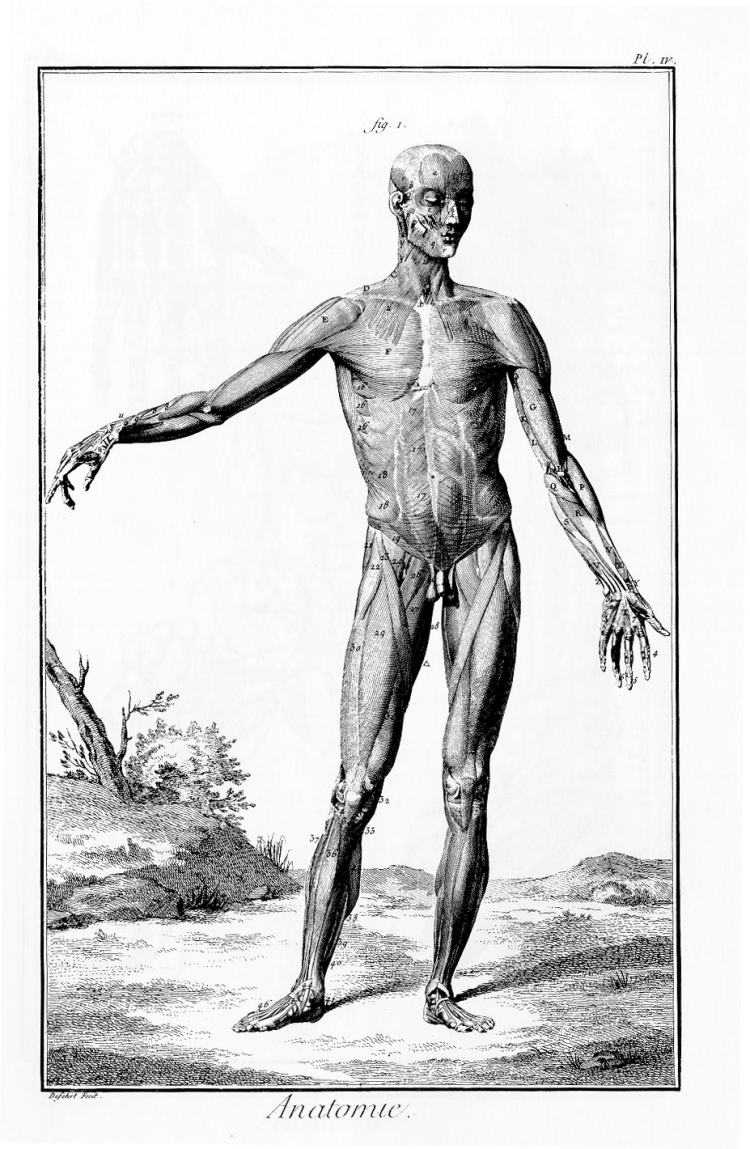
Muscular anatomy of a male human.

Wilhelm Reich, a student of Freud, first drew attention to the relationship between shallow breathing, blocked traffic, the difficulty in experiencing sexual pleasure, and emotional disorders, especially neuroses. This concept was developed by Alexander Lowen, founder of bioenergetics. He is also author of the concept of muscular block. Lowen noted that when people do not want to experience certain emotions, they tighten certain muscles. For example, when someone does not want to cry, they can tighten the jaws, which suppresses tears. Stress and anger tighten the muscles along the spine and thighs, which can manifest itself in pain in those body parts, if the stress was prolonged. According to Lowen, some tensions become chronic: the muscular block always activated, regardless of the circumstances. This is called a chronic tension block. Muscular block affects posture and the way humans move. Certain experiences influence the formation of specific areas of muscle, and thus the body's appearance, structure, and attitude.

==== Features of temperament ====
Constitutional theories in psychology (e.g., Sheldon, Kretschmer) emphasize the relationship between body structure and temperament. These theories have been around since Hippocrates thought that body structure goes hand in hand with the temperament and susceptibility to certain diseases. Scientific research on relationship of body appearance and temperament traits was begun in the early twentieth century by German psychiatrist Ernst Kretschmer. He studied the relationship between body structure and the onset of psychosis. Presented here in brief is the theory of Phyllis Whitman, William Sheldon, and Charles Katz. These researchers distinguished between different constitutional variations or physical nature of one's body, psychotic behavior reactions and temperament. The three constitutional variations are endomorphy, mesomorphy, and ectomorphy. The three corresponding psychotic behavior reactions are affective, heboid, and paranoid.

Some researchers have argued that Sheldon's findings of a strong relationship between body structure and the type of temperament are due to methodological shortcomings within his studies, and that the relationship between the two is actually lower than he claims.

== Other factors ==
Posture can easily be impacted by poor health and other factors. Thus, anyone using posture to assess personality, character, or psychology must first rule out possible underlying medical conditions which may be affecting a person's posture. Moreover, there is data claiming that one maintains their posture worse if they listens to the sentences which describe actions of others. For example, if your task is to maintain your posture rigorously in a state you do it worse when you listen to sentences like these: "I get up, put on my slippers, go to the bathroom".

Posture is highly affected by muscle length and tension patterns, such as tight hamstring muscles or pectoral muscles, as well as muscle strength (for example, abdominal, glutei, and trapezius strength). The posture of dancers and athletes often improves when they train for their sports. Additionally, breathing patterns affect posture. For example, breathing through the mouth causes the chin to tilt forward in order to open the airway, exacerbating forward head posture, whereas breathing through the nose allows the neck to stay in alignment.

== Implications in other domains ==
As stated, the study of postures can give a vast amount of information about emotions and self-perceptions. The study of posture has also proven beneficial in other fields. Professional counselors, who were the participants, had to view recorded interactions of counselors and clients and determine the emotions of the client. Researchers found that relying only on verbal communication to determine the emotions of the client resulted in an accuracy of only 66%. High levels of empathy could be misconstrued without the matching positive nonverbal communication. In similar studies it was noted that the arms and legs were the most important bodily factors in signaling low levels of empathy. Further, researchers suggested that counselors should not only be trained in verbal communication but also in nonverbal communication.

== See also ==
- Body language
- Kinesics
