= Ivy League nude posture photos =

20th-century medical photos at Ivy League schools

During the 1940s–1960s, nude photographs were routinely taken of incoming freshmen at elite colleges in the United States, such as the Ivy Leagues and Seven Sisters schools. Purportedly taken to assess the posture and health of the students, the bulk of the photographs were produced by W. H. Sheldon, a psychologist and eugenicist who believed non-white races were intellectually stunted. Sheldon developed a theory that measuring a human body could predict the subject's intelligence, temperament, and moral worth. The inspiration to take mass photos for his research came from the founder of eugenics, Francis Galton, who proposed such a photo archive for the British population.

Unknown college student getting "posture photo" taken, 1885. The handkerchief was used early on to preserve anonymity, but fell out of favor by the 1920s.

The institutions that had "posture photo" programs included Harvard, Yale, Princeton, Brown, Vassar, Wellesley, Mount Holyoke, Swarthmore, University of Pennsylvania, Hotchkiss, Syracuse, University of California, University of Wisconsin, Purdue, Brooklyn College, the Oregon Hospital for the Criminally Insane, and others. The years that each institution participated vary. Some schools, such as Harvard and Wellesley, had their own practice of taking posture photos well before Sheldon's involvement, as early as the 1880s.

Most of the photo archives were destroyed voluntarily by the schools in the 1960s and 1970s, after ending their posture photo practices. After Sheldon's death in 1977, his personal archive of over 20,000 photos and negatives was acquired by the Smithsonian Institution's National Anthropological Archives. These were never displayed, and could only be viewed by researchers who petitioned the chief archivist. After a write-up in the New York Times Magazine in 1995, the Smithsonian sealed the documents completely, and destroyed the Yale archives upon request.

Some celebrities have mentioned their experiences getting their posture photo taken, including Sylvia Plath, Nora Ephron, Dick Cavett and Judith Martin (the etiquette expert known as Miss Manners). In the 2020s posture photos of the actors James Franciscus and Bill Hinnant resurfaced and were sold on eBay.

== Background ==
=== Posture in US culture ===
Inventions by 19th-century German physician Moritz Schreber for correcting children's posture

American culture's fixation on posture started in the mid-18th century, when it was seen as a reflection of character, particularly for men. During the 1800s, posture became a part of etiquette (for men and women), aided by stiff clothing like corsets and greatcoats. It also took on a moral quality, helping differentiate upper classes from the "slouched and tired" working class, and also separating them from earlier aristocrats, who were considered "languid and morally loose".

By the end of the 19th century, as social rules (and clothing) became more relaxed, posture turned into a medical issue. "Good posture" was considered essential to good health, and slouching was said to crush internal organs, bringing about various ailments. There was a particular focus on children, and posture was a frequent subject of parenting manuals. In 1890, half of children were identified as having "abnormal" spinal curvatures.

=== Late 1800s posture photos ===
Concerned about the bad posture of the youth, some schools began photographing their students and taking various measurements (many not related to posture). Harvard's program started in the 1880s, as did some women's colleges. Participation was generally compulsory for the students.

The exact methods varied from school to school, but in general, photograph stations were set up in a gymnasium, where students were called within the first week of the school year. Each student would disrobe, pose on a platform, and be photographed from multiple angles. At first the photos were generally waist-up, and some schools took steps to hide the identity of the subject, such as covering the head with a handkerchief.

Further data was also taken. For example, officials at Vassar (which was a women's college at the time) took measurements of the waist, chest, hips, knees, calves, ankles, instep, elbows, wrists, head circumference, lung capacity, whether the student wore corsets, whether she had ever taken gym, her birthplace, her father's occupation, the nationality of her parents and grandparents, and her "temperament".

At Wellesley, the student's posture was graded from A to D, and if they received anything lower than an A, they were required to take a "remedial" course in posture. They were then rephotographed and regraded. The majority of Wellesley students (freshmen and above) received B or C grades.

Across all Massachusetts schools that took posture photos, it was reported in 1889 that female students were photographed and measured 50 times more often than male students, whose postures were deemed far superior.

=== Early 20th century posture photos ===
Unknown subject in a posture photo, c. 1925. High contrast prints were one method of preserving identity, but were not universal.

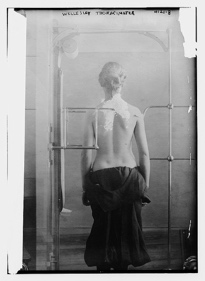
Unknown Wellesley student posing with a "thoracimeter", c. 1915

In the early 1900s, posture became even more important in American culture, with the formation of the American Posture League, contests like "Miss Perfect Posture", and college campuses with "posture police" that tagged students who were not walking or standing straight. In this atmosphere, it was common for public primary schools to run postural correction programs. College posture photo practices increased, and by 1925, most schools adopted full-body nudes, as recommended by the Boston Normal School of Gymnastics, which later became Wellesley's Department of Physical Education.

Wellesley spearheaded the advancement & spread of posture photo programs. They integrated new medical devices into the practice, such as the Demenÿ Machine starting in 1900, and later the "thoracimeter", which was invented at the school's Physical Training Department. In the 1930s, Wellesley started using "posture pointers", which were thin metal rods that were taped to various points of the subject's spine and chest. When viewed in profile, these rods would stick out from the body, and students were graded on how much the rods fanned out or touched.

Wellesley also helped popularize the practice at other schools. Beginning in the 1920s, the school circulated training films about posture measurement to other women's colleges, as well as some "progressive" high schools and elementary schools, many of which took up the practice.

== 1940s–1960s: Sheldon era ==
Posture photos began to hit their peak in the 1940s, thanks to W.H. Sheldon, a popular psychologist and eugenicist at the time. Sheldon had developed a theory that all human bodies could be classified into one of three "somatotypes": ectomorph (tall, skinny, weak, nervous), mesomorph (muscular, good posture), and endomorph (fat, short). He believed a person could be summed up by a three-digit number based on their somatotype, and that this number was innate and immutable. Sheldon also developed "constitutional psychology", which asserted that one's somatotype determined their mental characteristics, such as intelligence and temperament.

Sheldon's theories became popular in the 1940s, and in 1947 he was given his own laboratory to study "constitutional psychology" at Columbia University. Life magazine ran a cover story in 1951 about his theories, and Cosmo published quizzes about how to understand your husband based on his somatotype. Wanting to amass an archive of data on human bodies, Sheldon approached different colleges about running a compulsory photo program, or, if they already had one, taking it over. Many schools agreed.

From the 1940s to the 1960s, Sheldon shot and catalogued tens of thousands of full-body nude photos of college students. On the surface, the photos were to assess the subject's posture (and thus health), but many believe Sheldon was using them to further his somatotype research. He printed many of the Harvard nudes in his guide to body types, "Atlas of Men".

According to Sheldon's lifelong friend Ellery Lanier (father of virtual reality founder Jaron Lanier), the "posture" programs were "part of a facade or cover-up for what we were really doing", which was proving the Sheldonian theories that physique determined character. Lanier said the schools were complicit in this plan. Letters between Sheldon and Vassar officials in 1949–1950 show that the school was aware he wanted to include their students in an "Atlas of Women". The officials let Sheldon set up a photo station at the girls' mandatory physical exam, let him keep the photographs, and even said "we will be glad to have you use these girls as some of your 'guinea pigs.'"

The Harvard photos were also used by the tobacco industry, which funded research on the relationship between masculinity and smoking. A 1959 report in the journal Science said "weakness of the masculine component" was "more frequent in heavier smokers".

=== Downfall of the posture photo ===
In 1950, Sheldon set up his photo program at the University of Washington. One student told her parents about her experience, and "a battallion of lawyers and university officials stormed Sheldon's lab, seized every photo", and burned them all. This caused a brief controversy concerning the legitimacy of Sheldon's research, its ethics, and pornography.

Similar events happened at other women's colleges, including Pembroke, the coordinate women's college of Brown. Sheldon failed to compile enough photographs for his "Atlas of Women". Over time, Sheldon's theories became more discredited, and eugenics overall became disfavored due to its association with Nazism. All associated schools ended their posture photo programs and burned their archives, mostly during the 1960s and 1970s.

== Stolen/missing photos ==
Urban myths about stolen posture photos were common on campuses in the 1960s. The photos were said to be available on the "Ivy League black market", or only shown to members of campus secret societies. In 2004, a highly-embellished article about stealing the Vassar posture photos appeared on the Yale Alumni website, written by a 1959 graduate C. Davis Fogg. He describes hiring a mafia safe-cracker to help steal Vassar's archive, seeing the nudes of Roosevelt and Rockefeller girls, then selling the photos to male students to help them find dates, and eventually making $250,000 after expenses ("enough to buy 200 new Volkswagens"). The article has since been removed from the Yale website.

== Impact on the subjects ==
In later interviews, many women who had been posture photo subjects expressed profound embarrassment and pain over the experience, and even guilt about not objecting. Writer and filmmaker Nora Ephron (Wellesley '62) said, "We were idiots. Idiots!" Author Sylvia Plath wrote to her mother about the experience, where she strained to stand in the idealized "feminine" posture in front of the camera, and yet was graded as inadequate by the male administrators. This was fictionalized in her bestselling novel, The Bell Jar, where it is one of many experiences that push the main character toward mental illness.

After photographing the female freshmen at Denison University, Sheldon requested a reshoot due to a technical error. He was denied, because "to require them to pose for another [nude posture photo] would create insurmountable psychological problems."

Journalist Ron Rosenbaum, who looked through thousands of Sheldon's photos, remarked how the expressions of the female subjects were noticeably more distressed than the males. "I was surprised at how many looked deeply unhappy, as if pained at being subjected to this procedure. On the faces of quite a few I saw what looked like grimaces, reflecting pronounced discomfort, perhaps even anger."

Professor Kris Belden-Adams points out how the practice magnified gendered power dynamics:

The taking of posture pictures—50 times more often than pictures were made of their male counterparts—rendered these female subjects visible, vulnerably nude, and robbed of bodily agency. They were the objects of a photographer's gaze, and also for the viewing of Physical Education teachers, college administrators, the college's state bureaucracy, and the ERO [Eugenics Record Office]—all of which were dominantly male enterprises from the 1880s until the 1940s.

== Cavett–Wolf exchange ==
During his 1984 commencement speech at Yale, comedian Dick Cavett remarked that there were no female students when he attended Yale in the 1950s. Instead, the women went to Vassar, and Cavett mocked their looks, saying that the stolen Vassar posture photos could find no buyers, even on the black market.

Author Naomi Wolf, who was in the audience graduating that day, was horrified by the statement. She wrote about the joke in her book The Beauty Myth and in a 1992 op-ed piece in the New York Times. Wolf said, "Consciously or not, Mr. Cavett was using the beauty myth aspect of the backlash: when women come too close to masculine power, someone will draw critical attention to their bodies."

Cavett retorted with his own op-ed, saying his line was just a joke and Wolf should learn how to use humor. This exchange inspired journalist Ron Rosenbaum to investigate the posture photo program and its ties to the American eugenics movement. Rosenbaum eventually located W.H. Sheldon's photo archives in the Smithsonian Institution. His write-up in the New York Times Magazine caused the Smithsonian to destroy much of their archives, and permanently seal the rest.

== Ties to eugenics ==
From the 1880s–1940s, eugenics was considered a settled science in the US. While it was ostensibly about improving genetic quality for all humans, it tended to preserve the position of the dominant groups in the population. Many colleges at the time, even those without posture photo programs, recorded data of their students' body measurements, personalities, and heredity. This data was regularly sent to the Eugenics Record Office, which promoted the idea of race betterment.

The Boston Normal School of Gymnastics, which provided many New England schools with physical education courses before they developed their own departments (and pushed for posture photos to be full-body nudes), was well-connected to the eugenics movement. For example, the Normal School featured lectures by the dean of Harvard Medical School, Henry Pickering Bowditch, who advocated for eugenics and published findings from eugenics conferences. In Massachusetts, collecting the biometric data of college students from across the state was coordinated by Boston-based eugenicists, including Bowditch.

W.H. Sheldon was also a eugenicist who believed in the superiority of the white race. His studies asserted that the intelligence of African Americans came to a "standstill at about the 10th year", and that of Mexicans at about age 12. According to Yale professor George Hersey:

The reigning school of the time, presided over by E. A. Hooton of Harvard and W. H. Sheldon of Yale, held that a person's body, measured and analyzed, could tell much about intelligence, temperament, moral worth and probable future achievement.

Hooton was more outspoken about dividing humanity into races, and made proposals to "control and limit the production of inferior and useless organisms." His suggestions included penalizing the "inferior" if they reproduced, or sterilizing them altogether.

Hersey also stated that: "From the outset, the purpose of these 'posture photographs' was eugenic." Photographs provided tangible visual proof of the ideals of both "positive eugenics" (desired traits) and of "negative eugenics" (undesired traits). People possessing "positive eugenics" characteristics were encouraged to breed, while those possessing "negative eugenics" qualities were encouraged to abstain from breeding for the "good" of humanity. As Hersey put it, the ideal solution was "getting those Exeter and Harvard men together with their corresponding Wellesley, Vassar and Radcliffe girls."

Hersey also points out:

The Nazis compiled similar archives analyzing the photos for racial as well as characterological content (as did Hooton). Thus, from nose shape, forehead height and distance between lower lip and chin, a subject might be identified as 30 percent Mediterranean and 40 percent Danubian. The Nazis often used American high school yearbook photographs for this purpose."

After World War II, eugenics became associated with Nazism, and it fell out of favor in American culture, as did posture photo programs, and mass biometric tracking in general.

== See also ==
- Somatotype and constitutional psychology
- Eugenics in the United States
