= Somatotype and constitutional psychology =

Taxonomy to categorize human physiques

Somatotype is a theory proposed in the 1940s by the American psychologist William Herbert Sheldon to categorize the human physique according to the relative contribution of three fundamental elements which he termed somatotypes, classified by him as ectomorphic, mesomorphic, and endomorphic. He created these terms borrowing from the three germ layers of embryonic development: The endoderm (which develops into the digestive tract), the mesoderm (which becomes muscle, heart, and blood vessels) and the ectoderm (which forms the skin and nervous system). Later variations of these categories, developed by his original research assistant Barbara Heath, and later by Lindsay Carter and Rob Rempel, are used by academics today.

Constitutional psychology is a theory developed by Sheldon in the 1940s, which attempted to associate his somatotype classifications with human temperament types. The foundation of these ideas originated with Francis Galton and eugenics. Sheldon and Earnest Hooton were seen as leaders of a school of thought, popular in anthropology at the time, which held that the size and shape of a person's body indicated intelligence, moral worth and future achievement.

In his 1954 book, Atlas of Men, Sheldon categorized all possible body types according to a scale ranging from 1 to 7 for each of the three somatotypes, where the pure endomorph is 7–1–1, the pure mesomorph 1–7–1 and the pure ectomorph scores 1–1–7. From type number, an individual's mental characteristics could supposedly be predicted. In a late version of a pseudoscientific thread within criminology in which criminality is claimed to be an innate characteristic that can be recognized through particular physiognomic markers (as in Cesare Lombroso's theory of phrenology), Sheldon contended that criminals tended to be 'mesomorphic'. The system of somatotyping is still in use in the fields of physical education and cosmetology.

== The three types ==
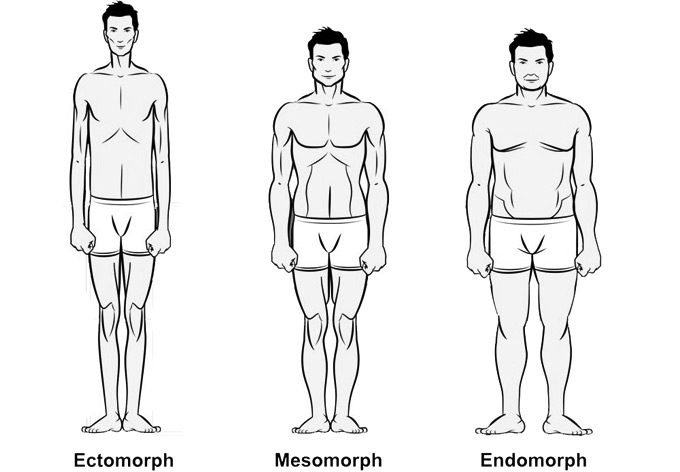
Comparison of Sheldon's body types

Sheldon's "somatotypes" and their associated physical and psychological traits were characterized as follows:

Somatotype	Physical traits	Psychological traits	Notes
Ectomorphic	characterized as skinny, usually tall with low testosterone levels, and having difficulty gaining weight and muscle mass	described as intelligent, gentle and calm, but self-conscious, introverted and anxious	
Mesomorphic	characterized as naturally hard and strong, with even weight distribution, muscular, thick-skinned, and as having good posture with narrow waist	described as competitive, extroverted, and tough	
Endomorphic	characterized as fat, usually short, and having difficulty losing weight	described as outgoing, friendly, happy and laid-back, but also lazy and selfish	

=== Stereotyping ===
There may be some evidence that different physiques carry cultural stereotypes, as some cultures are more prone to certain physiques. According to one study endomorphs are likely to be perceived as slow, sloppy, and lazy. Mesomorphs, in contrast, are typically stereotyped as popular and hardworking, whereas ectomorphs are often viewed as intelligent yet fearful.

== Heath–Carter formula ==
Sheldon's physical taxonomy is still in use, particularly the Heath–Carter variant of the methodology. This formulaic approach utilises an individual's body mass (kg), height (cm), upper arm circumference (cm), maximal calf circumference (cm), femur breadth (cm), humerus breadth (cm), triceps skinfold (mm), subscapular skinfold (mm), supraspinal skinfold (mm), and medial calf skinfold (mm), and remains popular in anthropometric research, according to Rempel: "with modifications by Parnell in the late 1950s, and by Heath and Carter in the mid 1960s somatotype has continued to be the best single qualifier of total body shape".

This variant utilizes the following series of equations to assess a subject's traits against each of the three somatotypes, each assessed on a seven-point scale, with 0 indicating no correlation and 7 indicating a very strong correlation:
$$\text{Endomorphy} = -0.7182 + 0.145x - 0.00068x^2 + 0.0000014x^3,$$
where $x = (\text{tricep skinfold [mm]} + \text{subscapular skinfold [mm]} + \text{supraspinal skinfold [mm]}) \times \frac{170.18}{\text{height [cm]}}.$

$$\begin{align}
\text{Mesomorphy} &= 0.858 \times \text{humerus breadth [cm]} \\
&+ 0.601 \times \text{femur breadth [cm]} \\
&+ 0.188 \times \text{upper arm girth [cm]} \\
&+ 0.161 \times \text{max calf girth [cm]} \\
&- 0.131 \times \text{height [cm]} \\
&+ 4.5
\end{align}$$

Ectomorphy: calculate the subject's ponderal index $\text{PI} = \frac{\text{height [cm]}}{(\text{mass [kg]})^{1/3}}.$

- If $PI > 40.74$, $\text{Ectomorphy} = 0.732 PI - 28.58.$
- If $39.65 < PI < 40.74$, $\text{Ectomorphy} = 0.463 PI - 17.615.$
- If $PI < 39.65$, $\text{Ectomorphy} = 0.5.$

This numerical approach has gone on to be incorporated in the current sports science and physical education curriculums of numerous institutions, ranging from the UK's secondary level GCSE curriculums (14- to 16-year-olds), the Indian UPSC Civil Service exams, to MSc programs worldwide, and has been utilized in numerous academic papers, including:

- Rowing athletes
- Tennis athletes
- Judo athletes
- Volleyball athletes
- Gymnasts
- Soccer athletes
- Triathletes
- Han people
- Persons with diabetes
- Taekwondo athletes
- Persons with eating disorders
- Dragon boat participants

== Criticism ==
"The Varieties of Human Physique" by Sheldon et al (1940) classified body types into three categories using data processes that would not be accepted by researchers today. Sheldon's ideas that body type was an indicator of temperament, moral character or potential – while popular in an atmosphere accepting of the theories of eugenics – were later disputed.

A key criticism of Sheldon's constitutional theory is that it was not a theory at all but a general assumption of continuity between structure and behavior and a set of descriptive concepts to measure physique and behavior in a scaled manner. His use of thousands of photographs of naked Ivy League undergraduates, obtained without explicit consent from a pre-existing program evaluating student posture, has been strongly criticized.

While popular in the 1950s, Sheldon's claims have since been dismissed as "quackery". Barbara Honeyman Heath, who was Sheldon's main assistant in compiling Atlas of Men, accused him of falsifying the data he used in writing the book.

== See also ==
- Biological anthropology
- Biomechanics
- Body mass index
- Body shape
- Eugenics in the United States
- Female body shape
- Gracility
- Kinanthropometry
- Neurobiological effects of physical exercise
- Physiognomy
- Physiology
- Somatology
- Somatotopic arrangement

== Sources ==
- Gerrig, Richard; Zimbardo, Phillip G. (2002). Psychology and Life (16th ed.). Boston: Allyn and Bacon. ISBN 0-205-33511-X.
- Hartl, Emil M.; Monnelly, Edward P.; Elderkin, Roland D. (1982). Physique and Delinquent Behavior (A Thirty-year Follow-up of William H. Sheldon's Varieties of Delinquent Youth). New York: Academic Press. ISBN 0-12-328480-5.
