= William Herbert Sheldon =

American psychologist, numismatist, and eugenicist (1898–1977)

Lieutenant Colonel William Herbert Sheldon
- Born: November 19, 1898; Warwick, Rhode Island, U.S.
- Died: September 17, 1977 (aged 78); Cambridge, Massachusetts, U.S.
- Education: Brown University (BSc; University of Colorado(MSc); University of Chicago (Ph.D, M.D.)
- Occupations: Psychologist and eugenicist
- Employer(s): Harvard University; Columbia University; University of Chicago

William Herbert Sheldon, Jr. (November 19, 1898 – September 17, 1977) was an American psychologist, numismatist, and eugenicist. He created the field of somatotype and constitutional psychology that correlate body types with temperament, illustrated by his controversial Ivy League nude posture photos.

== Early life and education ==
Sheldon was born in Pawtuxet, Rhode Island, on November 19, 1898, to William Herbert Sheldon, Sr., a naturalist and animal breeder, and Mary Abby Greene, a village midwife. His godfather was the noted psychologist and philosopher William James. He graduated from Warwick Veterans Memorial High School in 1915 and attended Brown University. After graduating, he worked in a range of fields before studying for his master's degree at the University of Colorado. Sheldon attended the University of Chicago and earned his Ph.D. in 1925. He taught psychology at the University of Chicago and at the University of Wisconsin. He attended the University of Chicago Medical Center, receiving his M.D. in 1933.

Gaining a two-year fellowship in Europe allowed him to study under Carl Jung, and visit Sigmund Freud and Ernst Kretschmer. After Europe, he moved to Harvard University in 1938. He served in the Army Medical Corps at lieutenant colonel rank in the Second World War.

From 1947 to 1959 he was Director of the Constitutional Laboratory at the Columbia University College of Physicians and Surgeons. He became a professor of medicine at the University of Oregon Medical School in 1951.

== Work ==
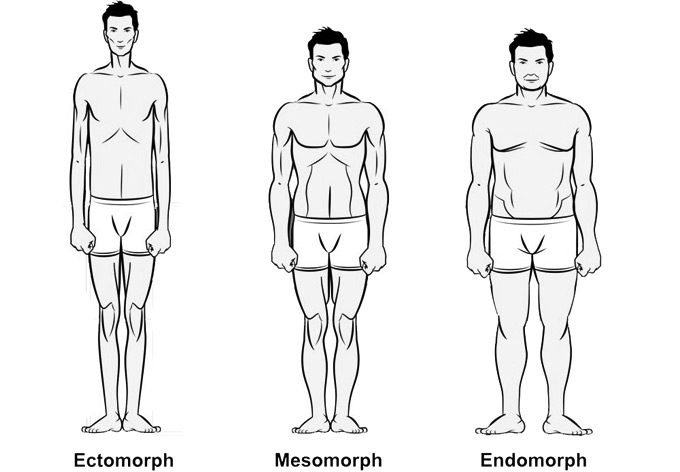
Somatotype classification

In psychology, he developed a new version of somatotypology by classifying people into endomorphic, mesomorphic, and ectomorphic types.Sheldon analyzed photographs and measurements of nude individuals from Ivy League schools. Ron Rosenbaum writes: "He believed that every individual harbored within him different degrees of each of the three-character components. By using body measurements and ratios derived from nude photographs, Sheldon believed he could assign every individual a three-digit number representing the three components, components that Sheldon believed were inborn -- genetic -- and remained unwavering determinants of character regardless of transitory weight change." In other words, the physique you are born with, is how you classify for life.

Sheldon also argued that physique was closely correlated with temperamental viscerotonic patterns that powerfully influenced attitudes toward food, comfort and luxury, ceremoniousness, sociability, nostalgia, pain, and a great variety of other aspects of human experience. Aldous Huxley took a considerable interest in and popularized knowledge of Sheldon's work, writing that "Sheldon has worked out what is, without question, the best and most adequate classification of human differences," and Sheldon's concepts influenced Huxley's understanding of himself, friends and family, characters in his own work and the work of others, various historical figures, and even entire schools of philosophy and religions.

=== Numismatic work ===
In numismatics, William Herbert Sheldon authored Early American Cents in 1949, and later revised that work within Penny Whimsy in 1958, (these were the most exhaustive catalogues of the varieties of early American large cents at that time). The book, still considered the standard reference on the series, was re-printed in 1976 and 1990. The Sheldon variety list for Early American Cents is still in use today.

He also developed the "Sheldon scale" that graded coins on a numeric basis from 1 to 70, which is still standard among American numismatists.

== Controversy, theft and posthumous lawsuits ==
William Herbert Sheldon was a numismatist, someone who studies and collects coins/currency. After his death, he was accused by the American Numismatic Society (ANS) of substituting lower-grade examples of his cent coins with higher-grade examples from the cabinets of the ANS. In all, he substituted 129 coins from the ANS for ones from his personal collection, and since then, the coins have gradually been returned by fellow collectors who have purchased them unknowingly.

Sheldon was also known for having anti-Semitic attitudes, which led to his firing from the university.Additionally, Sheldon deceived freshman at these Ivy League schools by explaining that the nude photographs were to check for scoliosis and other physical health conditions, but were actually used only for his and his colleagues' work.

== Death ==
Sheldon died in his office at the Biological Humanics Center in Cambridge, Massachusetts, on September 17, 1977. He is buried at Pawtuxet Burial Yard in Warwick, Rhode Island.

== Publications ==
- — (1936). Psychology and the Promethean Will. Harper & Brothers.
- — (1940). The Varieties of Human Physique (An Introduction to Constitutional Psychology). Harper & Brothers.
- — (1942). The Varieties of Temperament (A Psychology of Constitutional Differences). Harper & Brothers.
- — (1949). Varieties of Delinquent Youth (An Introduction to Constitutional Psychiatry). Harper & Brothers.
- — (1949). Early American Cents, 1793–1814. Harper & Brothers.
- — (1954). Atlas of Men. Harper & Brothers.
- — (1958). Penny Whimsy. Harper & Row.

== See also ==
- Ivy League nude posture photos
- Posture (psychology)
- Somatotype and constitutional psychology
