= Carl Jung publications =

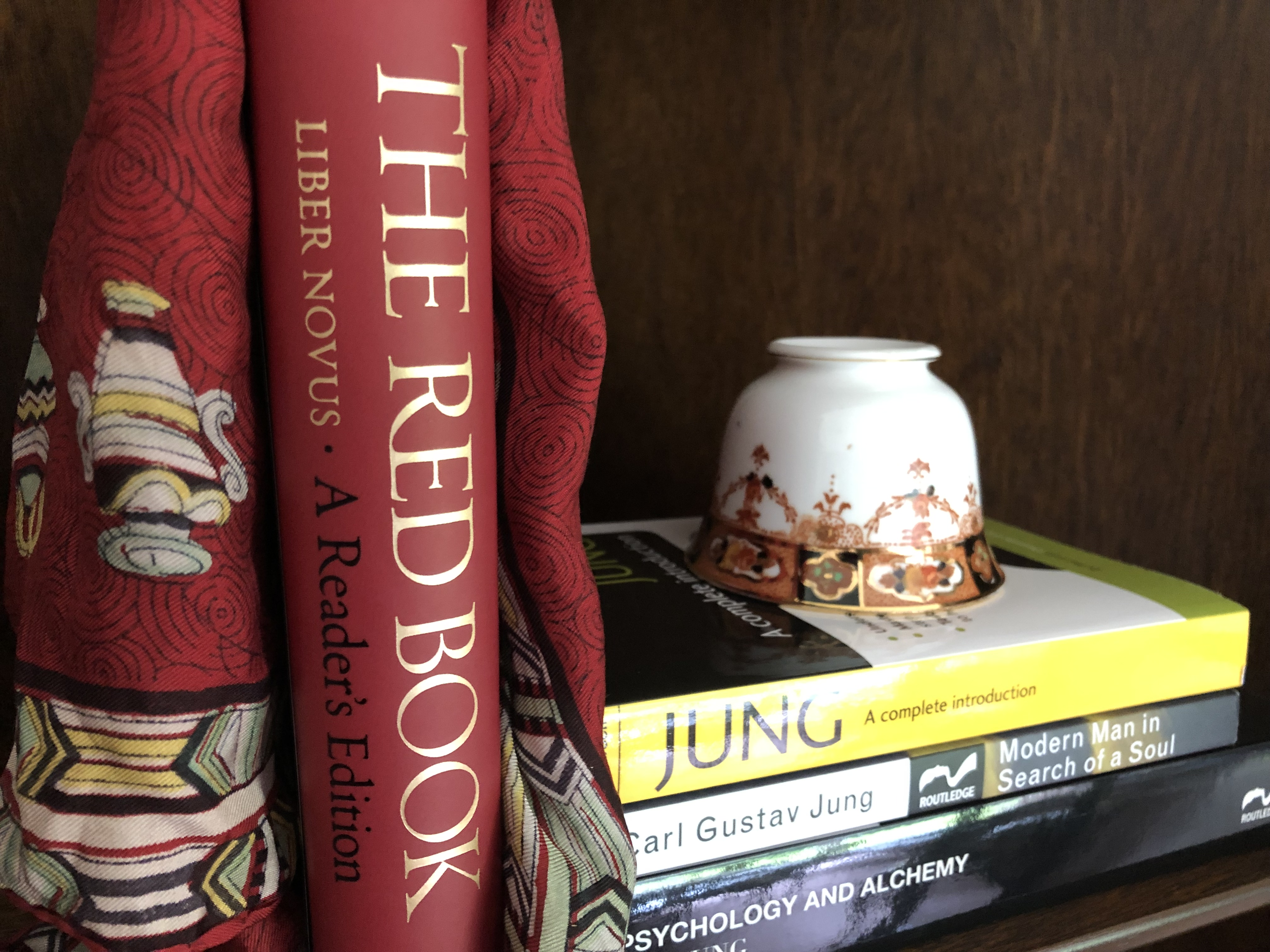
Carl Jung's Liber Novus (The Red Book), Modern Man in Search of a Soul and Psychology and Alchemy.

This is a list of writings published by Carl Jung. Many of Jung's most important works have been collected, translated, and published in a 20-volume set by Princeton University Press, entitled The Collected Works of C. G. Jung. Works here are arranged by original publication date if known.

== Works ==
- 1902–1905. Psychiatric Studies. The Collected Works of C. G. Jung Vol. 1. 1953, edited by Michael Fordham. London: Routledge & Kegan Paul / Princeton, NJ: Bollingen. (This was the first of 18 volumes plus separate bibliography and index. Not including revisions, the set was completed in 1967.)
- 1903. "On the Psychology and Pathology of So-Called Occult Phenomena" ["Zur Psychologie und Pathologie sogenannter occulter Phanomene."] His doctoral dissertation.
- 1904–1907. Studies in Word Association. London: Routledge & K. Paul. (contained in Experimental Researches, CW 2)
- 1907. The Psychology of Dementia Praecox (1st ed.). New York: Nervous and Mental Disease Publ. Co. (Contained in The Psychogenesis of Mental Disease, CW 3.) This is the disease now known as schizophrenia.
- 1907–1958. The Psychogenesis of Mental Disease. London: Routledge. (Collected Works Vol. 3, 1991 ed.)
- 1910. About the conflicts of a child's soul, Rascher Verlag, Leipzig
- 1912. Psychology of the Unconscious: a study of the transformations and symbolisms of the libido, a contribution to the history of the evolution of thought, translated by B. M. Hinkle, 1916. London: Kegan Paul Trench Trubner. (Revised in 1952 as Symbols of Transformation.)
- 1917. Collected Papers on Analytical Psychology (2nd ed.), with C. E. Long. London: Balliere Tindall & Cox. (contained in Freud and Psychoanalysis, CW 4)
- 1917, 1928. Two Essays on Analytical Psychology (1st ed). London: Routledge. (Revised in 1966, CW 7.)
- 1921. Psychological Types, or, The Psychology of Individuation, with H. G. Baynes London: Kegan Paul Trench Trubner. (Collected Works Vol. 6 ISBN 0-691-01813-8)
- 1928. Contributions to Analytical Psychology, H. G. Baynes and C. F. Baynes. London: Routledge & Kegan Paul.
- 1932. The Psychology of Kundalini Yoga: notes of a seminar by C.G. Jung, with S. Shamdasani. 1996 ed. Princeton, N.J.: Princeton University Press.
- 1933. Modern Man in Search of a Soul. London: Kegan Paul Trench Trubner, (1955 ed. Harvest Books ISBN 0-15-661206-2)
- 1934–1954. The Archetypes and the Collective Unconscious. (1981 2nd ed. Collected Works Vol.9 Part 1), Princeton, N.J.: Bollingen. ISBN 0-691-01833-2
- 1936. The Psychology of Dementia Praecox (2nd ed.).
- 1938. Psychology and Religion The Terry Lectures. New Haven: Yale University Press. (contained in Psychology and Religion: West and East Collected Works Vol. 11 ISBN 0-691-09772-0).
- 1940. The Integration of the Personality, with S. M. Dell. London: Routledge and Kegan Paul.
- 1944. Psychology and Alchemy (2nd ed. 1968 Collected Works Vol. 12 ISBN 0-691-01831-6). London: Routledge.
- 1947. Essays on Contemporary Events. London: Kegan Paul.
- 1947. On the Nature of the Psyche (revised in 1954). London: Ark Paperbacks. (1988 ed. contained in Collected Works Vol. 8).
- 1949. "Foreword." pp. xxi–xxxix (19 pages) In The I Ching or Book of Changes, Wilhelm/Baynes translation, Bollingen Edition 19. Princeton University Press.(contained in CW 11).
- 1951. Aion: Researches into the Phenomenology of the Self, Collected Works Vol. 9 Part 2. Princeton, N.J.: Bollingen. ISBN 0-691-01826-X
- 1952. Synchronicity: An Acausal Connecting Principle (1st ed.). Princeton, NJ: Princeton University Press, ISBN 0-691-01794-8 (contained in CW 8)
- 1952. Symbols of Transformation, Collected Works Vol. 5. (A revision of Psychology of the Unconscious, 1912.) ISBN 0-691-01815-4.
- 1952. Answer to Job. 1958 Princeton, N.J.: Princeton University Press (contained in Collected Works Vol. 11)
- 1956. Mysterium Coniunctionis: An Inquiry into the Separation and Synthesis of Psychic Opposites in Alchemy (1st ed.). London: Routledge. This was Jung's last book length work, completed when he was eighty.
- 1957. "The Undiscovered Self (Present and Future)". 50-page essay, also contained in CW 10.
  - New York: American Library, 1959.
  - New York: Bollingen, 1990: ISBN 0-691-01894-4.
- 1958. Psyche and Symbol: A Selection from the Writings of C.G. Jung, edited by V. S. De Laszlo. Garden City, NY: Doubleday.
- 1959. Flying Saucers: A Modern Myth of Things Seen in the Skies. London: Routledge & Paul, [1959].
- 1959. Basic Writings, edited by V. S. De Laszlo. New York: Modern Library.
- 1962. Memories, Dreams, Reflections [autobiography], recorded and edited by Aniela Jaffé. London: Collins. ISBN 0-679-72395-1.
- 1964. Conversations with Carl Jung and Reactions from Ernest Jones, with Ernest Jones, edited by R. I. Evans. New York: Van Nostrand.
- 1964. Man and His Symbols, with Marie-Louise von Franz. Garden City, N.Y.: Doubleday, ISBN 0-440-35183-9
- 1966. The Practice of Psychotherapy: Essays on the Psychology of the Transference and other Subjects (Collected Works Vol. 16). Princeton, NJ: Princeton University Press.
- 1966. Two Essays on Analytical Psychology (revised, 2nd ed.), Collected Works Vol. 7. London: Routledge.
- 1967. The Development of Personality, Collected Works Vol. 17 ISBN 0-691-01838-3.
- 1968. Analytical Psychology: Its Theory and Practice (a.k.a. "The Tavistock Lectures")
- 1970. Four Archetypes; Mother, Rebirth, Spirit, Trickster. Princeton, N.J.: Princeton University Press. (contained in CW 9 part 1)
- 1970. Mysterium Coniunctionis (2nd ed.), Collected Works Vol. 14. London: Routledge. ISBN 0-691-01816-2.
- 1973. Synchronicity: An Acausal Connecting Principle (2nd ed.). Princeton, NJ: Princeton University Press. ISBN 0-691-01794-8.
- 1974. Dreams. Princeton, NJ: Princeton University Press (compilation from Collected Works Vols. 4, 8, 12, 16), ISBN 0-691-01792-1
- [1917] 1974. The Freud/Jung Letters: The Correspondence between Sigmund Freud and C. G. Jung, translated by R. F. C. Hull and Ralph Mannheim, edited and with an introduction by William McGuire.
- 1976. The Portable Jung [compilation], edited by J. Campbell. New York: Penguin Books. ISBN 0-14-015070-6
- 1978. Abstracts of the Collected Works of C.G. Jung, edited by C. L. Rothgeb, S. M. Clemens, and National Clearinghouse for Mental Health Information. Washington, DC: U.S. Govt. Printing Office.
- 1983. The Essential Jung [compilation], edited by Anthony Storr. Princeton, NJ: Princeton University Press, ISBN 0-691-02455-3
- 1986. Psychology and the East. London: Ark. (contained in CW 11)
- 1987. Dictionary of Analytical Psychology. London: Ark Paperbacks.
- 1988. Psychology and Western Religion. London: Ark Paperbacks. (contained in CW 11)
- 1990. The World Within: C.G. Jung in his own words [video recording], with S. Wagner, G. Wagner, and L. Van der Post. New York, NY: Kino International / Insight Media.
- 1991. Psychological Types (revised ed.), translated by R. F. C. Hull. London: Routledge.
- 1997. Jung on Active Imagination, edited by J. Chodorow. Princeton, N.J.: Princeton University Press.
- 1998. Jung's Seminar on Nietzsche's Zarathustra (abridged ed.), edited by J. L. Jarrett. Princeton, NJ: Princeton University Press.
- 2001. Atom and Archetype: The Pauli/Jung Letters, 1932–1958, with Wolfgang Pauli, edited by C. A. Meier. Princeton, NJ: Princeton University Press. ISBN 0-691-01207-5.
- 2007. The Jung-White Letters, with Victor White. Philemon Series.
- 2007. Children's Dreams. Philemon Series.
- 2009. The Red Book. Liber Novus, edited by Sonu Shamdasani. Philemon Series & W. W. Norton & Co. ISBN 978-0-393-06567-1
- 2011. The Jung-Kirsch Letters: The Correspondence of C.G. Jung and James Kirsch, with James Kirsch, edited by Ann Conrad Lammers. Routledge. ISBN 9780415419215.
- 2012. Jung contra Freud: The 1912 New York Lectures on the Theory of Psychoanalysis. Philemon Series & Princeton University Press.
- 2012. Introduction to Jungian Psychology: Notes of the Seminar on Analytical Psychology Given in 1925. Philemon Series & Princeton University Press.
- 2013. The Question of Psychological Types. Philemon Series & Princeton University Press.
- 2014. Atom and Archetype: The Pauli/Jung Letters, 1932–1958, Jung, C. G. and Pauli, Wolfgang. ed. Meier, C. A.; Zabriskie, Beverley and Roscoe, David. 2014-07-01. Princeton University Press. ISBN 978-0-691-16147-1.
- 2014. Dream Interpretation Ancient and Modern. Philemon Series & Princeton University Press.
- 2015. The Solar Myths and Opicinus de Canistris: Notes of the Seminar given at Eranos in 1943. Daimon Verlag. ISBN 9783856309763
- 2015. The Jung & Neumann Correspondence. Philemon Series & Princeton University Press.
- 2015. Notes from C. G. Jung's Lecture on Gérard de Nerval's "Aurélia". Philemon Series & Princeton University Press.
- 2018. History of Modern Psychology: Lectures Delivered at the ETH Zurich, Volume 1: 1933–1934. Philemon Series & Princeton University Press.
- 2018. The Art of C. G. Jung, W. W. Norton & The Foundation of the Works of C.G. Jung.
- 2019. Dream Symbols of the Individuation Process. Notes of C. G. Jung's Seminars on Wolfgang Pauli's Dreams, Philemon Series & Princeton University Press.
- 2020. On Theology and Psychology: The Correspondence of C. G. Jung and Adolf Keller, Philemon Series & Princeton University Press.
- 2020. The Black Books, edited by Sonu Shamdasani. Philemon Series & W. W. Norton & Co. ISBN 9780393088649
- 2021. Psychology of Yoga and Meditation: Lectures Delivered at ETH Zurich, Volume 6: 1938–1940. Philemon Series & Princeton University Press.
- 2021. Encounters with C.G. Jung. The Journal of Sabi Tauber (1951–1961). Daimon Verlag.
- 2022. Consciousness and the Unconscious: Lectures Delivered at ETH Zurich, Volume 2: 1934. Philemon Series & Princeton University Press.
- 2023. Jung on Ignatius of Loyola's Spiritual Exercises: Lectures Delivered at ETH Zurich, Volume 7: 1939–1940. Philemon Series & Princeton University Press.
- 2023. Reflections on the Life and Dreams of C.G. Jung by Aniela Jaffé from conversations from Jung. Historical Commentary by Elena Fischli. Daimon Verlag.
- 2023. Treasures from the Archive: C. G. Jung Institute Zürich-Küsnacht. Images Created by Patients in Analysis 1917–1955. Analytical Psychology Press.
- 2023. C. G. Jung: Letters to Hedy Wyss (1936–1956). Daimon Verlag.
- 2025. On Dreams and the East: Notes of the 1933 Berlin Seminar. C. G. Jung and Heinrich Zimmer. Philemon Series & Princeton University Press.
- 2025. Jung’s Life and Work: Interviews for Memories, Dreams, Reflections with Aniela Jaffé. Philemon Series & Princeton University Press.
- 2027. C. G. Jung: The Critical Edition, Volume 1 (1896–1900): Student Years in Basel: Philosophy, Medicine, Science, and Spiritualism. Princeton University Press.
- 2027. C. G. Jung: The Critical Edition, Volume 2 (1901–1904): Psychiatry and Psychical Research: Jung at the Burghölzli Asylum. Princeton University Press.

== Sources ==
- Juliette Vieljeux, "Catalogue chronologique des écrits de Carl Gustav Jung", Cahiers Jungiens de Psychanalyse, hors-série, 1996.
