= Beatrice M. Hinkle =

American Jungian psychiatrist

Beatrice Moses Hinkle
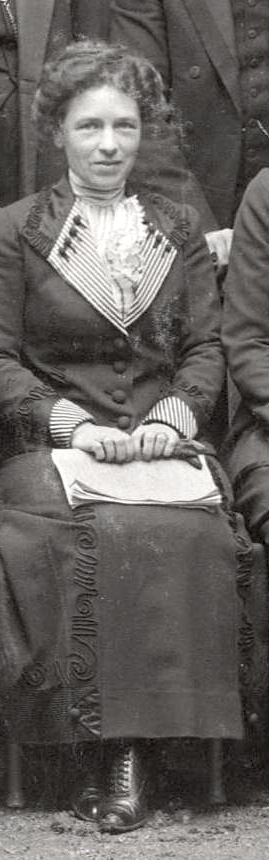
- Beatrice Hinkle in 1911
- Born: 1874; San Francisco, California
- Died: 1953 (aged 78–79)
- Education: Cooper Medical College
- Occupations: Psychoanalyst, writer, and translator

Beatrice Moses Hinkle (1874–1953) was a pioneering American feminist, psychoanalyst, writer, and translator of C. G. Jung.

== Family, marriage, education ==
Hinkle was born in San Francisco, California, to physician B. Frederick Moses and Elizabeth Benchley Van Geisen Moses. Yet her father was killed in an accident before she was born. In 1892 when eighteen she married Walter Scott Hinkle, an assistant district attorney.

Hinkle considered studying law, but was discouraged by her husband "with a good hardy laugh". Instead in 1895 she entered "the hitherto all-male" Cooper Medical College (now part of Stanford University). At age 25 she graduated with a degree as a medical doctor in 1899. However, shortly before receiving her degree her husband died. She then supported their two children.

== Early career in medicine and psychology ==
In 1905, Hinkle was appointed the city physician of San Francisco. She was the first woman doctor in America to hold such a public health position. The responsibilities of this office marked her subsequent career in medicine. Through her experience in public health administration, she developed her interest in the emotional dimension of healing. She considered that the reason for her rate of success in treatments was that she "poured her own vitality, her own belief into the patient" and that a doctor's work was to "reinforce the spirit that makes for recovery."

In 1908 Hinkle moved to New York City. That year she joined the staff of Dr. Charles L. Dana, 'America's leading neurologist'. They would open the country's first "psychotherapeutic clinic" at Cornell Medical College (located in Manhattan). She remarried, her new husband Philip Garrett Eastwick was a businessman.

In New York City "Hinkle explored yoga, hypnotism, and psychoanalysis" and upstate a New Thought sanatorium. Hinkle later wrote that since about 1903 she'd been concerned with treatment of people suffering from psychic disturbances, from what she called "soul sickness". She was searching for cures. Then in 1909 "Freud's first work his Studien über Hysteria came into my hands".

Psychoanalysis

In 1909 she traveled to Vienna for study under Sigmund Freud. Although she admired Freud's contributions to psychoanalysis, she eventually broke with his teachings instead favoring Carl Jung. It was then the norm that the student in training to practice psychoanalytic therapy would herself became a patient, i.e., an analysand. Thus Hinkle in 1911 was "analyzed by Jung".

Later, after beginning therapeutic work with her own patients, she grew increasingly dissatisfied with what she considered Freud's narrow understanding of the human psyche, especially regarding gender and the role of women. In 1923 Hinkle wrote, "I found myself more in sympathy with Jung's points of view... than with the rigid sexual hypotheses of the strictly Freudian analysts".

Hinkle "was an early feminist". Freud's approach seemed to her to lack the proper recognition of a women's psychic autonomy, so that in effect Freud pushed Hinkle to align with the adherents of Carl Jung.

Weimar Conference, 1911

Hinkle attended the Weimar Conference in 1911. At this psychoanalytic gathering both Freud and Jung participated. A welcome novelty was the presence of women psychoanalysts from the Zurich school. In addition to America's Dr. Hinkle, there were continental women: Lou Andreas-Salomé, Maria Moltzer, Martha Böddinghaus, Toni Wolff, and Emma Jung. Absent was Sabina Spielrein.

Emma Jung was delighted to meet Beatrice Hinkle. "Each had a composed elegance" and yet they enjoyed being at such a conference, hearing timely issues discussed by cutting-edge intellects. According to author Catrine Clay, "She was exactly the kind of woman Emma liked."

Emma liked the American medical doctor Beatrice Moses Hinkle and agreed with her husband that she was 'an American charmer'. A woman slightly older than Jung, Hinkle was then married to a wealthy American and comfortable with her professional and social position. Emma enjoyed her company, and for a brief time Hinkle became her role model.

Listening to Freud repeat his assertion that the female psyche was a derivation of the male's, Dr. Hinkle returned to New York in 1915 determined to spread Jung's contrary views. In 1922 "Jung's most prominent advocate in the United States [was] Beatrice Hinkle".

== Translation of Jung's Wandlungen und Symbole der Libido (1912) ==
A major contribution of Beatrice Moses Hinkle was being among the first to present C. G. Jung's writing to the English-speaking world. Jung had attracted her admiration because of his understanding of the female psyche as independent from that of the male. She became the first official translator of his work in America.

Entitled Psychology of the Unconscious. A Study of the Transformations and Symbolisms of the Libido, her translation was published in New York in 1916 by Moffat, Yard, and in London in 1917 by Kegan, Paul. It included her 40-page "An introduction to psychoanalysis and analytic psychology". The psychologist and editor John Kerr many years later commented on Part I of the Jung's 1912 book and her rendering of it:

Jung had half a masterpiece here and he seemed to know it from the first page. The English translation is flawed, but even so, it captures some of the flavor of what was basically a stylistic triumph. Here is how the translator Beatrice Hinkle, rendered Jung's beginning: "Anyone who can read Freud's Interpretation of the Dream without scientific rebellion at the newness and apparently unjustified daring of its analytic presentation and without moral indignation at the astonishing nudity of the dream interpretation... will surely be deeply impressed... ."

In her 40-page "An introduction" Hinkle demonstrated her assimilation of the viewpoints both of Freud and Jung. A patient's psychiatric symptoms may stem from forgotten memories of very painful events. Hidden to avoid traces of psychic trauma (the corresponding emotional wounds and/or unwanted inferences), the memory drops out of the patient's consciousness. Yet a later recall of 'forgotten' events is possible. In fact, if the patient can establish a conscious connection between the 'repressed' memory of painful events (newly recalled in therapy) and the disturbing emotions left by trauma, the troubling symptoms might disappear, an astonishing cure. A clinical method or process, 'the free association of ideas', might assist the patient, by letting impressions or feelings flow, despite existing mental blockage. This therapeutic method may unlock the most affected elements, and thus allow the patient to establish a conscious link between the 'forgotten' event and its corresponding trauma: hence, the cure. "This important group of ideas or impressions, with the feelings and emotions clustered around them, which are betrayed through this process, was called by Jung a complex."

She had become somewhat a part of her translation since her own ideas, it is claimed, had entered into it. She renewed and augmented its theories, contributions derived from her work as a therapist and her personal experience with both Freud and Jung. She broadened the context of terms such as "repression" and "complex", manifested by the patient while being psychoanalyzed.

Her translated Psychology of the Unconscious was widely reviewed. Eugene O'Neill chose this Jung book the most influential of psychoanalytic literature. Jack London wrote that its reading was like "standing on the edge of a world so new, so terrible, so wonderful that I am almost afraid to look over into it." The book was a publishing sensation and remained in print for the next thirty years.

In 1952 Carl Jung published "an extensive revision" of this work with a new title, Symbole der Wandlung. Beforehand in 1950, referring to advancements in psychological studies that might cause him to revise this book, Jung drew particular attention to Erich Neumann, his key work The Origins and History of Consciousness (1949). The book's editors also footnote to Neumann's The Great Mother (1952).

Under the English title Symbols of Transformation ( 1956), in his "Translator's Note" R. F. C. Hull states, "During the preparation of this volume, the text of the original English translation by Beatrice M. Hinkle... was freely consulted."

== International Conference of Women Physicians (1919) ==
The Conferance, organized by the YWCA, was held at the Waldorf Astoria in New York City, September 15 to October 24, 1919. Serving on its Project Committee were Kristine Mann and Eleanor Bertine, both medical doctors who became Jungian analysts. Constance Long, a British physician and an analyst, who had edited a 1916 collection of essays by Carl Jung in English, and Beatrice Hinkle unsuccessfully lobbied to persuade Jung to address the Conference.

== "A Study of Psychological Types" (1922) ==
Hinkle's article was written as a "detailed elaboration" in response to Jung's 1913 article "A preliminary study of Psychological Types". She drew on her experiences during her therapeutic practice of testing the value of Jung's preliminary type theories. The challenging results of her investigations became the basis for her creative understanding and presentation.

Her article "A Study of Psychological Types" was written before the publication of Jung's 1921 book Psychologische Typen, a work intricately related to Jung's own professional experiences. Unfortunately Hinkle's article did not appear in print until later, in 1922. It then appeared as Chapter V in her 1923 book.

== The Re-Creating of the Individual (1923) ==
After an Introduction, Part One chapters:

- I. Analytic Psychology. The Development of the Individual
- II. The Child. A Discussion of the Freudian Sexual Interpretation
- III. The Unconscious. Its Dynamic Manifestations in Human Life
- IV. Dream, Phantasy, and Symbolism. Their Present and Prospective Value for the Dreamer

Part Two chapters:

- V. A Study of Psychological types
- VI. Masculine and Feminine Psychology
- VII. The Psychology of the Artist and the Significance of Artistic Creation
- VIII. The Process of Reintegration of the Individual,
- IX. The Significance of Psychoanalysis for the Spiritual life.

== Psychotherapy practice in America ==
New York City

On her return to New York, Hinkle worked translating Jung's 2012 book. She wrote her psychoanalytic articles and began her own book. When Jung came to deliver his nine lectures at Fordham in 1912, he visited Hinkle at her apartment near Gramercy Park. There she introduced him to Charlotte Teller, a young free-lance journalist and activist from Colorado, who interviewed Jung for The New York Times.

Dr. Hinkle resumed her medical work at Cornell College and her practice as a psychotherapist. Notable patients included Margaret Naumberg and her sister Florence Cane. Naumberg's youthful revolt "against family, friends, class, and country" led her to seek psychoanalysis. Later she started the progressive Walden School. Both sisters became educators, developing and writing on the new field of art therapy.

Among her analysands was James Oppenheim, editor of The Seven Arts. He dedicated a book of poetry to Jung and Hinkle. Oppenheim became a lay analyst, and published several popular books on Jungian psychology.

Hinkle family lore includes a few stories. One is about the politician Franklin Roosevelt, that she helped him regain his self-confidence after he contracted polio in 1921. Another is about her friendship with the anthropologist Margaret Mead, "until the two had a falling out". "Beatrice Hinkle [was] one of the leading female psychoanalytic therapist in New York City".

Connecticut

In the 1920s Hinkle maintained Roughlands, her country home in Connecticut. Down the road from Roughlands, she started Smokey Hollow Lodge a residential treatment facility in a renovated farmhouse. It opened in 1928. Patients would pass time there during treatments for various problems, as did Bing Crosby for alcoholism. The New Yorker writer Nancy Hale was treated for writer's block.

During the 1930s Hinkle was living and working in Washington, Connecticut. Among her activities she served as the director of a sanatorium.

Bailey Island

In 1936 Hinkle was at Bailey Island, Maine for a gathering of analysts and analysands. It was organized by the 'American trio' of Esther Harding, Kristine Mann, and Eleanor Bertine, along with Hinkle.

The site was Mann's ancestral homestead, 'The Trident', where during summer months several analysts would set up their psychotherapy practice. That year the Jungs attended, and Carl gave a series of lectures. "Emma was able to spend time with her old friend from the Weimar Conference, Beatrice Hinkle."

== Women analysts and Social activism ==
The Valkyries

Her life in the field of psychoanalysis brought Hinkle into association with various women professionals. Yet Hinkle was often characterized as an outsider to the inner core of key Jungian women. At her meeting Jung, she was already an established physician, had held public office and co-founded a clinic. She'd published her writings and had made a popular translation of Jung's book. About a generation older, married to her second husband until her 1926 divorce, her two children born in the 1890s.

Sir Laurens van der Post described these women as "one of the most remarkable groups of remarkably gifted women ever assembled around a single man, however great". An opinion shared by author Deirdre Bair. Later these women were called Jungfrauen or Valkyries, once "belittling appellations".

At the 1911 Weimar Conference appeared perhaps an originating nuclear group. The women of the Zurich School: Emma Jung, Beatrice Hinkle, Toni Wolff, Maria Moltzer, plus for a time Sabina Spielrein, Martha Böddinghaus, Lou Andreas-Salomé. In 1919 at the Women Physician Conference appeared: Kristine Mann, Eleanor Bertine, Constance Long. Others: the authors Marie-Louise von Franz, and Esther Harding, Jolande Jacobi the impresario, Linda Fierz-David. The list here is not exhaustive.

The Heterodoxy Club

To a visiting Jung Hinkle introduced her avant-garde circles in downtown New York. The Heterodoxy Club welcomed Hinkle's psychoanalytic view of feminism. The desires of modern women were inclusive of more than formal political aspirations. Liberation of the inner individual, advancing a person's conscious awareness of the self in her own lived world and on her own terms.

Hinkle also belonged to the Liberal Club. It was a leading New York reform group located near Gramercy Park, just a few blocks from her apartment. Hinkle brought Jung to a meeting. "The atmosphere had been rather stiff and formal until Jung broke the ice by addressing a pet dog." She introduced him to Kahlil Gibran.

The New York Psychoanalytic Society, however, rejected her "for her allegiance to Jung". The American Psychoanalytic Association was more eclectic.

== Later writings on psychology and gender ==
Dr. Hinkle thought that one of the most attractive parts of Jung's theories was referred to the relief for those in revolt against the repressive character of the patriarchal society that under girded Freud's worldview (Karier, 1986). In this aspect, Jung proposed that the mother is the real dominant figure in the child's life and not the father as proposed by Freud. This also allowed for a break with the masculine dominance of Freudian psychology without blurring the traditional distinctions between masculine and feminine psychosexual roles. About this particular Jung's assertion, Dr. Hinkle expressed: "Jung's development of this point of view shows very clearly that, just as the problem of the father is the great fact of Freud's psychology, the problem of the mother is the essence of Jung's, with the struggle carried on between the two great forces of love and power" (Karier, 1986, p. 291). Thus Jung's consideration of the female psyche as independent from males, attracted the admiration of Dr. Hinkle in such degree that she became the official translator of his work in America.

Hinkle was a member of the Greenwich Village based feminist network, the Heterodoxy Club, lending credence to the group by being the only professionally trained and practicing psychoanalyst. It was as a member of this group that she began writing, including occasional contributions to 'Progressive Education Survey' and Harper's Magazine. Her themes included women's rights, women's suffrage, and issues of divorce, individualism, and legal status. She wrote often of the need for women to liberate themselves from what she called the "psychic bondage" of women to men.

== Bibliography ==
=== Primary ===
Translation

- C. G. Jung, Psychology of the Unconscious : A Study of the Transformations and Symbolisms of the Libido ([Leipzig: Deuticke 1912]; New York: Moffat, Yard 1916, reprint Dodd, Mead 1944; Princeton: Bollingen 1991).

Book

- Hinkle, The Re-Creating of the Individual (London: George Allen & Unwin 1923).

Selected articles

- Hinkle, "Methods of psychotherapy", in Psychotherapy 2/16-17 (1909).
- Hinkle, "Jung's Libido Theory and the Bergsonian Philosophy" in New York Medical Journal (1914).
- Hinkle, "A study of Psychological Types" in The Psychoanalytic Review, vol. IX, no.4 (1922).
- Hinkle, in Our Changing Morality: A Symposium (New York: A. & C. Boni, 1924), edited by Freda Kirchwey.
- Hinkle, "The Chaos of Modern Marriage", in Harper's Magazine (December 1925).
- Hinkle, "Marriage in the New World", in The Book of Marriage, edited by Hermann von Keyserling (New York: Harcourt, Brace & Co. 1926).
- Hinkle, "Woman's Subjective Dependence Upon Man", in Harper's Magazine (January 1932).
- Hinkle, in These Modern Women: Autobiographical Essays from the Twenties, edited by Elaine Showalter (The Feminist Press at City University of New York, 2d ed. 2003). ISBN 1-55861-007-3

=== Secondary ===
Books

- Maggy Anthony, Jung's Circle of Women. The Vlkyries (York Beach ME: Nicolas-Hays 1990, rev.ed. 1999).
- Deirdre Bair, Jung. A biography (Boston: Little, Brown & Company 2003).
- Catrine Clay, Labyrinths. Emma Jung, her marriage to Carl, and early psychoanalysis (Harper-Collins 2016).
- C. G. Jung, Psychology of the Unconscious. A study of the transformation and symbolism of the Libido ([Leipzig: Deuticke 1912]; New York: Moffat, Yard 1916, Dodd, Mead 1944; Princeton: Bollingen 1991).
- C. G. Jung, Symbols of Transformation ([Zurich 1952]; Princeton: Bollingen 1956, 2d ed. 1967).
- C. G. Jung, Psychologische Typen (Zürich: Rascher 1921; London & New York 1923; Princeton 1971).
- C. G. Jung, C. G. Jung Speaking. Interviews and encounters (Bollingen, Princeton 1977).
- Clarence J. Karier, Scientists of the Mind. Intellectual founders of modern psychology (University of Illinois 1986).
- John Kerr, A Most Dangerous Method. Jung, Freud, and Sabina Spielrein (Alfred A. Knopf, New York 1993).
- Robert McHenry, Famous American Women. A bibliographic dictionary (Dover 1980).
- V. Walter Odajnyk, Archetype and Character. Power, Eros, Spirit, and Matter Personality Types (New York: Palgrave Macmillan 2012).
- Sonu Shamdasani, Jung and the Making of Modern Psychology (Cambridge University 2003).
- Jay Sherry, The Jungian strand in transatlantic modernism (Palgrave Mcmillan 2018).
- Gerhard Wehr, Jung. A biography (Munich, Kösel 1985; Boulder: Shambala 1987, 2001).

Articles

- C. G. Jung, "A contribution to the study of Psychological Types" [1913], as Appendix 1 in Psychological Types (Bollingen 1971). CW, v.6.
- Nancy Hale, re Hinkle in Dictionary of American Biography, Supplement 5 (1977).
- Constance Long, "Review of Beatrice Hinkle, 'A study of psychological types'", in British Journal of Psychology 2/4, 229-233 (1922).
- William McGuire, "Introduction" in Jung (1991).
- Anne O'Hagan, "Beatrice Hinkle, Mind explorer" in Woman Citizen, v.12, p. 46 (July 1927).
- Jay Sherry, “Beatrice Hinkle and the Early History of Jungian Psychology in New York”, in Behavioral Science (Basel), 3/3: 492–500 (Sept. 2013) doi:10.3390/bs3030492
- Jay Sherry, "Jung, Hinkle, and Teller, the New York Times reporter" in Jung in the Academy and beyond (New Orleans: Spring Journal Books 2015), edited by Mattson, Wertz, Fogarty, Klenck, and Zabriskie.
- Eugene I. Taylor, "Foreward" in Jung (1991).
- Kate Wittenstein, "The feminist uses of psychoanalysis: Beatrice M. Hinkle and the foreshadowing of modern feminism", in Journal of Women's History, 10/2 (Summer 1998). Harper's Magazine articles
- Book review (Psychology of the Unconscious), in The New York Times (1923). [full citation needed]
