= Puer aeternus =

Child-god who is forever young, in mythology and as an archetype

Puer aeternus (Latin for 'eternal boy'; female: puella aeterna; sometimes shortened to puer and puella) in mythology is a child-god who is eternally young.

In the analytical psychology of Carl Jung, the term is used to describe an older person whose emotional life has remained at an adolescent level, which is also known as "Peter Pan syndrome", a more recent pop-psychology label. In Jung's conception, the puer typically leads a "provisional life" due to the fear of being caught in a situation from which it might not be possible to escape. The puer covets independence and freedom, opposes boundaries and limits, and tends to find any restriction intolerable.

== In mythology ==
The phrase puer aeternus comes from Metamorphoses, an epic work by the Roman poet Ovid (43 BC – c. 17 AD) dealing with Greek and Roman myths. In the poem, Ovid addresses the child-god Iacchus as "puer aeternus" and praises him for his role in the Eleusinian Mysteries. Iacchus is later identified with the gods Dionysus and Eros.

The puer is a god of vegetation and resurrection; the god of divine youth, such as Tammuz, Attis, and Adonis.

== In Jungian psychology ==
Swiss psychiatrist Carl Jung developed a school of thought called analytical psychology, distinguishing it from the psychoanalysis of Sigmund Freud (1856–1939). In analytical psychology (or "Jungian psychology"), the puer aeternus is an example of what Jung considered an archetype, one of the "primordial, structural elements of the human psyche".

The shadow of the puer is the senex (Latin for 'old man'), associated with the god Apollo—disciplined, controlled, responsible, rational, ordered. Conversely, the shadow of the senex is the puer, related to Hermes or Dionysus—unbounded instinct, disorder, intoxication, whimsy.

Like all archetypes, the puer is bipolar, exhibiting both a "positive" and a "negative" aspect. The "positive" side of the puer appears as the Divine Child who symbolizes newness, potential for growth, hope for the future. He also foreshadows the hero that he sometimes becomes (for example, Heracles). The "negative" side is the child-man who refuses to grow up and meet the challenges of life head-on, waiting instead for his ship to come in and solve all his problems.

"For the time being one is doing this or that... it is not yet what is really wanted, and there is always the fantasy that sometime in the future the real thing will come about.... The one thing dreaded throughout by such a type of man is to be bound to anything whatever."

"Common symptoms of puer psychology are dreams of an imprisonment and similar imagery: chains, bars, cages, entrapment, bondage. Life itself...is experienced as a prison."

When the subject is a female, the Latin term is puella aeterna, imaged in mythology as the Kore (Greek for 'maiden'). One might also speak of a puer animus when describing the masculine side of the female psyche, or a puella anima when speaking of a man's inner feminine component.

=== Jung's works ===
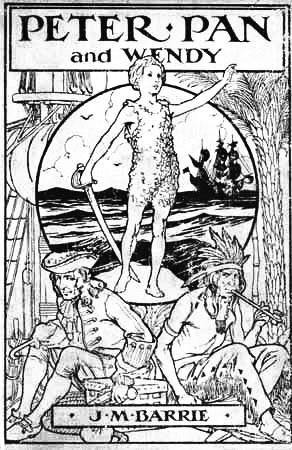
Cover of 1915 edition of J.M. Barrie's 1911 novel Peter and Wendy

Carl Jung wrote a paper on the puer aeternus, titled "The Psychology of the Child Archetype", contained in Part IV of The Archetypes and the Collective Unconscious (Collected Works, Vol. 9i). The hero-child aspect and his relationship to the Great Mother is dealt with in chapters 4 and 5 of Part Two of Symbols of Transformation (CW, vol. 5).

In his essay "Answer to Job" (also included in Psychology and Religion: West and East) Jung refers to the puer aeternus as a figure representing the future psychological development of human beings.

That higher and 'complete' (teleios) man is begotten by the 'unknown' father and born from Wisdom, and it is he who, in the figure of the puer aeternus—'vultu mutabilis albus et ater'—represents our totality, which transcends consciousness. It was this boy into whom Faust had to change, abandoning his inflated onesidedness which saw the devil only outside. Christ's 'Except ye become as little children' prefigures this change, for in them the opposites lie close together; but what is meant is the boy who is born from the maturity of the adult man, and not the unconscious child we would like to remain."

The Problem of the Puer Aeternus is a book based on a series of lectures that Jungian analyst Marie-Louise von Franz gave at the C.G. Jung Institute, Zurich, during the Winter Semester, 1959–1960. In the first eight of twelve lectures, von Franz illustrates the theme of the puer aeternus by examining the book The Little Prince by Antoine de Saint-Exupéry. The remaining four lectures are devoted to a study of a German novel by Bruno Goetz, Das Reich ohne Raum ("The Kingdom Without Space"), first published in 1919. Of this novel von Franz says:

It is interesting that it was written and published before the Nazi movement came into being in 1933, before Hitler was ruminating on his morbid ideas. Bruno Goetz certainly had a prophetic gift about what was coming, and ... his book anticipates the whole Nazi problem, throwing light upon it from the angle of the puer aeternus."

Now or Neverland is a 1998 book written by Jungian analyst Ann Yeoman dealing with the puer aeternus in the form of Peter Pan, one of the most well-known examples of the concept in the modern era. The book is a psychological overview of the eternal boy archetype, from its ancient roots to contemporary experience, including a detailed interpretation of J. M. Barrie's popular 1904 play and 1911 novel.

Mythologically, Peter Pan is linked to [...] the young god who dies and is reborn...as well as to Mercury/Hermes, psychopomp and messenger of the gods who moves freely between the divine and human realms, and, of course, to the great goat-god Pan [....] In early performances of Barrie's play, Peter Pan appeared on stage with both pipes and a live goat. Such undisguised references to the chthonic, often lascivious and far from childlike goat-god were, not surprisingly, soon excised from both play and novel."

== Peter Pan syndrome ==
Peter Pan syndrome is the popular psychology concept of an adult who is socially immature. The category is an informal one invoked by laypeople and some psychology professionals in popular psychology. It is not listed in the Diagnostic and Statistical Manual of Mental Disorders, and is not recognized by the American Psychiatric Association as a specific mental disorder.

Psychologist Dan Kiley popularized the Peter Pan syndrome in his 1983 book, The Peter Pan Syndrome: Men Who Have Never Grown Up. His next book, The Wendy Dilemma (1984), advises women romantically involved with "Peter Pans" how to improve their relationships.

== See also ==
- Apprentice complex
- Kidult
- Vulnerable adult
- NEET
- James Hillman
- Disney Adult
