= Participation mystique =

Concept in Jungian psychology

Participation mystique, or mystical participation, refers to the instinctive human tie to symbolic fantasy emanations. According to Carl Jung, this symbolic life precedes or accompanies all mental and intellectual differentiation. The concept is closely tied to that of projection because these contents, which are often mythological motifs, project themselves into situations and objects, including other persons.

== Overview ==
Jung defines participation mystique as one of his basic definitions in Psychological Types, crediting it to Lucien Lévy-Bruhl.

PARTICIPATION MYSTIQUE is a term derived from Lévy-Bruhl. It denotes a peculiar kind of psychological connection with objects, and consists in the fact that the subject cannot clearly distinguish himself from the object but is bound to it by a direct relationship which amounts to partial identity. (Jung, [1921] 1971: paragraph 781).

Jung used the term throughout his writings after Lévy-Bruhl's work was published in 1912. Jung referred to it consistently with the French terminology rather than using the English "mystical participation" until Man and His Symbols was published after his death.

The further we go back into history, the more we see personality disappearing beneath the wrappings of collectivity. And if we go right back to primitive psychology, we find absolutely no trace of the concept of an individual. Instead of individuality we find only collective relationship or what Lévy-Bruhl calls participation mystique (Jung, [1921] 1971: par. 12).

Jung's concept of concretism, which is the opposite of differentiating abstraction, is also closely related to participation mystique.

I am reminded of another mental case who was neither a poet nor anything very outstanding, just a naturally quiet and rather sentimental youth. He had fallen in love with a girl and, as so often happens, had failed to ascertain whether his love was requited. His primitive participation mystique took it for granted that his agitations were plainly the agitations of the other, which on the lower levels of human psychology is naturally very often the case. Thus he built up a sentimental love-fantasy which precipitately collapsed when he discovered that the girl would have none of him (Jung, 1966: par. 231).

This is what the distinguished French ethnologist Lucien Lévy-Bruhl called a "mystical participation" (Jung et al., 1964:24).

However, Lévy-Bruhl actually recanted his theory.

He later retracted this term under pressure of adverse criticism, but I believe that his critics were wrong. It is a well-known psychological fact that an individual may have an unconscious identity with some other person or object (Jung et al., 1964:24).

In Mysterium Coniunctionis (Jung, [1955] 1970:250 note 662), Jung had gone into more detail to defend his own theory in light of the recantation.

Elsewhere in Mysterium Coniunctionis Jung summarily dismisses the objections raised by ethnologists, attributing their objections to lack of knowledge of the unconscious.

Lévy-Bruhl's view has recently been disputed by ethnologists, not because this phenomenon does not occur among primitives, but because they have not understood it. Like so many other specialists, these critics prefer to know nothing of the psychology of the unconscious. (Jung, [1955] 1970:488 note 106).

== Recent scholarship ==
A volume of scholarly essays on the concept of participation mystique recently appeared under the title Shared Realities, edited by Mark Winborn. The authors included in this volume are mostly Jungian and psychoanalytic practitioners, discussing experiential, clinical and theoretical perspectives on the notion of participation mystique.

== Bibliography ==
- Jung, C.G. ([1921] 1971). Psychological Types, Collected Works, Volume 6, Princeton, N.J.: Princeton University Press. ISBN 0-691-01813-8.
- Jung, C.G. (1966). Two Essays on Analytical Psychology, Collected Works, Volume 7, Princeton, N.J.: Princeton University Press. ISBN 0-691-01782-4.
- Jung, C.G. ([1955] 1970). Mysterium Coniunctionis, Collected Works, Volume 14, Princeton, N.J.: Princeton University Press. ISBN 0-691-01816-2.
- Jung, C.G., et al. (1964). Man and His Symbols, New York, N.Y.: Anchor Books, Doubleday. ISBN 0-385-05221-9.
- Lévy-Bruhl, L. ([1912] 1926). How Natives Think, Translated by Lilian A. Clare, London, 1926.
