= Alchemical Studies =

1967 book by Carl Gustav Jung

- Author: Carl Jung
- Translator: R. F. C. Hull
- Language: German
- Series: The Collected Works of C. G. Jung
- Publication date: 1967
- ISBN: 0-691-01849-9

Alchemical Studies (German: Studien über alchemistische Vorstellungen), volume 13 in The Collected Works of C. G. Jung, consists of five long essays by Carl Jung that trace his developing interest in alchemy from 1929 onward. Serving as an introduction and supplement to his major works on the subject, the book is illustrated with 42 drawings and paintings by Jung's patients.

The psychological and religious implications of alchemy were Jung's major preoccupation during the last thirty years of his life. The essays in this volume complete the publication of his alchemical researches, to which three other volumes have been entirely devoted: Mysterium Coniunctionis, Psychology and Alchemy, and Aion. This volume can serve as an introduction to Jung's work on alchemy. The first essay, on Chinese alchemy, marked the beginning of his interest in the subject, and was originally published in a volume written jointly with Richard Wilhelm. The other four are now published for the first time completely in English.

Overall, this book discusses the philosophical and religious aspects of alchemy, as according to Jung, alchemy was introduced more as a religion than a science. Jung's concluding statement is that when alchemy became virtually shunned out of existence, the investigation of the human psyche went undiscovered for several hundred years.

Detailed abstracts of each chapter are available online.

== I: Commentary on The Secret of the Golden Flower (1929, 1938) ==
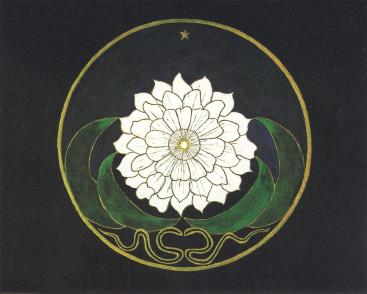
Eastern mandala created by a patient of Jung. Several of these mandalas are published alongside Jung's commentary on The Secret of the Golden Flower.

This commentary on the Secret of the Golden Flower, a Taoist alchemical text believed to be from the 12th century, was first published by Jung and Richard Wilhelm in 1929. It was revised in 1938 with an additional foreword by Jung.

In his opening statements, Jung asserts that,

Science is the tool of the Western mind…and it obscures our insight only when it claims that the understanding it conveys is the only kind there is." In this chapter, he investigates Taoism, meditation, and corresponding alchemic studies. The golden flower is the light, and the light of heaven is the Tao. Jung mentions that a fatal error in modern thought is that "we believe we can criticize the facts of religion intellectually…we think God is a hypothesis that can be subjected to intellectual treatment, to be affirmed or denied.

== II: The Visions of Zosimos (1937, 1954) ==
This text originally comes from a lecture delivered by Jung at the Eranos Conference at Ascona, Switzerland in 1937. It was revised and expanded in 1954. Much of this chapter is devoted to a translation of Zosimos of Panopolis's The Treatise of Zosimos the Divine concerning the Art, an important alchemical text from the 3rd century CE. Jung follows this with his psychological commentary on the dream. In doing this he examines the symbolism around water, homunculi, sacrifice, the Philosopher's Stone and its parallels to Christ. Jung concludes that "although chemistry has nothing to learn from the vision of Zosimos", it is invaluable to modern psychology.

== III: Paracelsus as a Spiritual Phenomenon ==
Here Jung focuses on the texts of Paracelsus, who was "infuriated beyond measure by the resistance of his opponents and made enemies everywhere." Most of his writings were "violently rhetorical" and his mannerism of speaking was forceful, as if the reader was listening unwillingly. Jung had great difficulty deciphering the text because Paracelsus would tend to use "a magical witch-language" without giving any rational explanation as to what it actually means. For example, instead of zwirnfaden (twine) he says swindafnerz, instead of nadel (needle) he uses dallen, instead of leiche (corpse) Chely.

Jung also notes that "in magical rites the inversion of letters serves the diabolical purpose of turning the divine order into an infernal disorder." Jung notes that Paracelsus had no notion of psychology, but affords "deep insights into psychic events which the most up-to-date psychology is only now struggling to investigate again."

He also investigates Paracelsus' the Iliaster and its three forms: sanctitus (from sancire, 'to make unalterable or inviolable'), paratetus (possibly, 'to obtain by prayer'), and magnus. The Iliaster, according to Paracelsus, was a key to longevity, although Jung saw it more like a principle of individuation.

== IV: The Spirit Mercurius (1942, 1953) ==
This section comes from two lectures delivered by Jung at the Eranos Conference, Ascona, Switzerland in 1942. The lectures were published that year, expanded on in 1948 and then published in English in 1953. The text addresses the concept of Mercury (or Hermes) in fairy tale, in alchemy as compared to water, fire, spirit and soul, its dual and triune natures, its appearance in astrology and Hermeticism, and finally in relation to the prima materia in the alchemical magnum opus.

== V: The Philosophical Tree (1945, 1954) ==
The contents of this section come from Jung's essay "Der philosophische Baum", first published in 1945, then revised and expanded in 1954.

== Translations ==
- Jung, C.G. (1968). Alchemical Studies, Collected Works of C.G. Jung, Volume 13, Princeton, N.J.: Princeton University Press. ISBN 978-0-691-09760-2
- Jung, C.G. (1968). Alchemical Studies, Collected Works of C.G. Jung, London: Routledge. ISBN 978-0-7100-6189-8
