= Mary Esther Harding =

American physician & Jungian analyst

- Born: 1888; Shropshire, England
- Died: 1971 (aged 82–83); London, England
- Education: London School of Medicine for Women
- Occupation: Psychoanalyst
- Known for: Jungian psychoanalysis

Mary Esther Harding (1888–1971) was a British-American Jungian analyst who was the first significant Jungian psychoanalyst in the United States.

== Personal life ==
Mary Esther Harding was born in Shropshire, England, the fourth of six daughters of dental surgeon, William Harding. (A son died, aged five-and-a-half, a month before she was born. Coming so soon after his death, Esther maintained throughout her life that her being a girl was a bitter disappointment to her parents.) She was an avid reader and was home-schooled until the age of eleven. Harding and her sisters were encouraged by their parents to learn. Three of them attended university in the first two decades of the 20th century.

== Career ==
=== Medical training ===
Harding attended the London School of Medicine for Women, intending to become a missionary doctor. She graduated in 1914 in a class of nine students. She interned at the Royal Infirmary in London, the only hospital in London to accept women interns at the time. In 1919 she was the first recipient of the William Gibson Research Scholarship for Medical Women, awarded by the Royal Society of Medicine. She wrote her first book, The Circulatory Failure of Diphtheria, but contracted the disease herself. Once she had recovered, with her father's financial help, she set up in private practice in London. She did very well, and had a keen interest in cardiology. Later she became interested in psychiatry, which was then only beginning to be taken seriously A friend, Constance Long, gave her Beatrice Hinkle's translation of Psychology of the Unconscious by Carl Gustav Jung. This prompted Harding to move to Switzerland, in 1922, to study under him, along with a small group of other students attending Jung's Küsnacht home near Zurich. In 1923, Harding and H.G. Baynes organised a conference, held in Polzeath, Cornwall, where Jung gave daily lectures in the village hall to around 30 students. She described this, and two other conferences, in a paper delivered before the First International Congress for Analytical Psychology held in Zurich in August 1958, later published in Contact with Jung, edited by Michael Fordham.

=== Psychoanalyst ===
While in Zürich, Harding developed a close relationship with Eleanor Bertine, who had arrived there in 1919 with Kristine Mann, after attending an International Conference of Medical Women. In 1924, Harding and Bertine relocated to New York City, where they lived for many years at 88 Morningside Drive, New York. Harding developed an extensive practice as a psychoanalyst, becoming one of the chief exponents of Jung's teachings and, as a leading member of the Carl Jung Foundation, lectured widely in the United States and in Europe. She wrote extensively, mainly in English but also in German. Each year Harding and Bertine would travel to Zürich for two months of analysis and spend summers at "The Inner Ledge", Bailey Island, Maine, the ancestral summer home of Kristine Mann. There they saw analysands from the United States and Canada in a quiet, comfortable setting away from the distractions of daily life and conducive to profound experiences of the unconscious.

=== Early feminist psychoanalysis ===
Published in 1933 and 1935 respectively, The Way of All Women and Women's Mysteries were pioneering works in the field of psychology from a feminist perspective, exploring topics such as work, marriage, motherhood, old age and women's relationships, from a Jungian standpoint. Jung himself praised both as an accurate application of Jungian theory. In his introduction to The Way of All Women, he wrote: "Drawing on her rich psychotherapeutic experience, Dr. Harding has sketched a picture of the feminine psyche which, in scope and thoroughness, far surpasses previous works in this field."

=== Jungian Community ===
Mary Esther Harding became influential in the New York City Jungian analytical psychology community. She was a prodigious writer and a frequent lecturer in the United States and Canada. Her first book on analytical psychology, entitled The Way of All Women, became a best seller and has been translated into several languages, helping to introduxw readers to Jungian thought. Harding wrote several other books, including: Psychic Energy, Women's Mysteries, The Parental Image, and The I and not I, along with numerous papers on a variety of subjects from depression to religion.

Harding helped to found many Jungian organizations, such as the Analytical Psychology Club of New York in 1936, the Medical Society for Analytical Psychology - Eastern Division in 1946, and the C.G. Jung Foundation for Analytical Psychology in 1963.

== Death ==
Harding died in her sleep on 4 May 1971 in a London airport hotel, on her way back to New York from Greece via her sister's house in Shrewsbury. She was survived by her elder sister, Olive Elwin née Harding, who studied mathematics at Cambridge University in the 1900s and was married to a grandson of William Stephen Jacob.

== Bibliography ==
- M. Esther Harding, The Circulatory Failure of Diphtheria: A thesis for the degree of Doctor of Medicine in the University of London, University of London Press, 1920, ASIN B00087EDZI
- M. Esther Harding, Woman's Mysteries. Ancient and modern: A psychological interpretation of the feminine principle as portrayed in myth, story, and dreams (London: Longmans, Green 1936; rev'd ed., New York: Pantheon 1955), ASIN B0006AU8SI
- M. Esther Harding, The Way of All Women, Putnam Publishing, New York: 1970 ISBN 1-57062-627-8
- M. Esther Harding, Psychic Energy, its source and goal, New York, Pantheon, 1947, Bollingen Series No. 10, ASIN B00005XR4E
- M. Esther Harding, Psychic Energy: Its Source and Its Transformation, foreword by C.G. Jung, 1963, Paper 0-691-01790-5
- M. Esther Harding, The Parental Image;: Its injury and reconstruction; a study in analytical psychology, Published by Putnam for the C. G. Jung Foundation for Analytical Psychology (1965), ASIN B0006BMVIM
- Mary Esther Harding, The I and the Not-I, Bollingen: 1 January 1974, ISBN 0-691-01796-4
- Esther M. Harding, The Value and Meaning of Depression, Analytical Psychology Club, June, 1985, ISBN 0-318-04660-1
- M. Esther Harding, A short review of Dr. Jung's article Redemption ideas in alchemy, ASIN B0008C5SP2
- M. Esther Harding, The mother archetype and its functioning in life, Analytical Psychology Club of New York City, 1939, ASIN B00089E47S
- M. Esther Harding, Afterthoughts on The Pilgrim, Analytical Psychology Club of New York, 1957, ASIN B0006RJAD0
- M. Esther Harding, Inward Journey, Sigo; 2nd edition, October, 1991, ISBN 0-938434-61-6
- M. Esther Harding, Way of All Women: a Psychological Interpretation, HarperCollins, 1 January 1975, ISBN 0-609-03996-2
- M. Esther Harding, Journey Into Self, Longman Green & Co., 1956
- M. Esther Harding, Woman's Mysteries: Ancient & Modern, Longmans Green & Co., 1935
- M. Esther Harding, The Way of All Women, Longman Green & Co., 1933
