= The Freud/Jung Letters =

1974 book edited by William McGuire

- Editor: William McGuire
- Translator: R. F. C. Hull and Ralph Manheim
- Published: 1974
- Publisher: Princeton University Press
- ISBN: 9780691036434 (1994 ed.)

The Freud/Jung Letters: The Correspondence between Sigmund Freud and C. G. Jung is a book, edited by William McGuire and first published by Princeton University Press in 1974, that compiles the 360 letters that psychoanalysts Sigmund Freud and Carl Jung wrote to each other from 1906 until their break in 1914.

Lionel Trilling wrote in The New York Times, "In no way does it disappoint the large expectation it has naturally aroused," and (apart from minor reservations about some of the translations) the quality of the edition is widely recognised.

== Thematics ==
Besides providing a wealth of material about both the theoretical and the institutional developments of early psychoanalysis, the correspondence also charts the intense relationship between Freud and Jung during the period in question. Where Jung wrote of his "unconditional veneration" for Freud, the latter in turn claimed that "Your person has filled with confidence in the future." What has been seen as a mixture of narcissistic idealisation and grandiosity on the part of both men, combined with the persisting theoretical differences of substance over the libido theory in particular, led ultimately to the break-up of the relationship – giving the shape of the correspondence something of the appearance of a classic tragedy.

== See also ==
- Memories, Dreams, Reflections
- Sabina Spielrein
