= Charlotte Teller =

American writer and socialist (1876–1953)

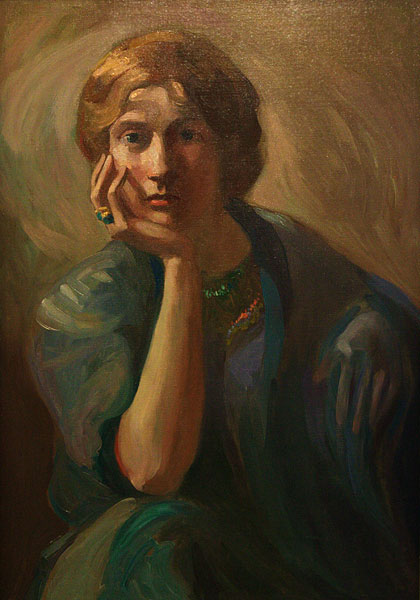
- Kahlil Gibran, Portrait of Charlotte Teller, c. 1911
- Born: Charlotte Rose Teller; March 3, 1876
- Died: December 30, 1953 (aged 77)
- Other names: John Brangwyn
- Occupation: Writer
- Spouses: Frank Minitree Johnson (m. 1902; div.); Gilbert Julius Hirsch (m. Oct. 14, 1912; died May 3, 1926)
- Parents: James Harvey Teller (father); Frances Leonora Wheelock (mother)

Charlotte Rose Teller, later Hirsch (March 3, 1876 – December 30, 1953), also using the pen name John Brangwyn, was an American writer and socialist active in New York City. She graduated in 1899 from the University of Chicago (BA). Her book The Cage was published in 1907. Mark Twain had offered to endorse it "in the form of a letter to the actress Maude Adams". Mary Haskell introduced Teller and Kahlil Gibran to each other in January 1908.

Charlotte Teller came from an eminent Colorado family. Her father, James [Harvey] Teller, later rose to become the Attorney-General of the state, while her uncle, Henry Teller, was a famous and respected Senator.

Her marriage to Frank Minitree Johnson ended in a divorce. On October 14, 1912, she married Gilbert Julius Hirsch (December 16, 1886 – May 3, 1926); they had a son, Richard, born September 12, 1914.
