= Psychology and Alchemy =

Book by Carl Gustav Jung

Psychology and Alchemy, volume 12 in The Collected Works of C. G. Jung, is Carl Jung's study of the analogies between alchemy, Christian dogma, and psychological symbolism.

Alchemy is central to Jung's hypothesis of the collective unconscious. This book begins with an outline of the process and aims of psychotherapy as seen by Jung. It then moves on to work out the analogies mentioned above and his own understanding of the analytic process. Jung reminds us of the dual nature of alchemy, comprising both the chemical process and a parallel mystical component. He also discusses the seemingly deliberate mystification of the alchemists. Finally, in using the alchemical process to provide insights into individuation, Jung emphasises the importance of alchemy in relating to us the transcendent nature of the psyche.

In Psychology and Alchemy, Jung makes the case that the philosopher's stone is a latent reality that exists within the self rather than an external object, and that the alchemists were attempting to communicate this internal dialogue—a conversation between the various components of the human psyche—through the use of esoteric symbols and terminology of the day.

Detailed abstracts of each chapter are available online.

== Overview ==
In this book, Jung argues for a reevaluation of the symbolism of Alchemy as being intimately related to the psychoanalytical process. Using a cycle of dreams of one of his patients he shows how the symbols used by the Alchemists occur in the psyche as part of the reservoir of mythological images drawn upon by the individual in their dream states. Jung draws an analogy between the Great Work of the Alchemists and the process of reintegration and individuation of the psyche in the modern psychiatric patient.

In drawing these parallels Jung reinforces the universal nature of his theory of the archetype and makes an impassioned argument for the importance of spirituality in the psychic health of the modern man. Lavishly illustrated with images, drawings and paintings from Alchemy and other mythological sources including Christianity the book is another example of Jung's immense erudition and fascination with the eso- and exoteric expressions of spirituality and the psyche in religion and mysticism.

Influenced by pioneering work by Ethan Allen Hitchcock and Herbert Silberer (who was in turn influenced by Jung), Psychology and Alchemy is a seminal work of reevaluation of a forgotten system of thought which did much to revitalise interest in Alchemy as a serious force in Western philosophical and esoteric culture.

Also interesting about this book is that the patient whose dreams are being analyzed in the second section is the physicist Wolfgang Pauli, who would go on to collaborate with Jung on such ideas as the acausal connecting principle of synchronicity. The dreams are interpreted as a series to elucidate the meanings of recurring motifs and symbols, with the series culminating in the vision of a 'world clock', which is actually several clocks on different planes operating on different scales and colours as a symbol of Pauli's unconscious apprehension of some grand cosmic order. Three of the best of these dreams were also mentioned by Jung in his Terry lectures Psychology of Religion.

== Content ==
The fundamental thesis Jung is advancing about the relationship between Alchemy and Psychology is that for pre-scientific humans there is not a sharp distinction between subject and object and thus this leads them to unconsciously project their own inner states onto external objects (especially objects that are mostly unknown to them), so a reflective analysis of alchemical symbols becomes revelatory about the unconscious psychic life of this time period. Prior to this rational segregation of experience the world was a totally different one, phenomenologically, as people did not distinguish between the qualities of the object they were perceiving and their own values, emotions, and beliefs. It is partly for this reason that the alchemists cannot say aloud exactly what the philosopher's stone really 'is' and why there are so many different symbols for the work.

For the alchemist trying to understand matter and develop base metals into their purest form, gold, substances are grouped as being alike based on their perceived value. Jung documents as these alchemists collectively come to understand that they themselves must embody the change they hope to effect within their materials: for instance, if they hope to achieve the philosopher's stone that can redeem 'base' or 'vulgar' metals, then the alchemist too must become a redeemer figure. It became apparent to the alchemists that they were trying to redeem nature as Christ had redeemed man, hence the identification of the Lapis Philosophorum with Christ the Redeemer. The Opus (work) of alchemy, viewed through this interpretation, becomes a symbolic account of the fundamental process the human psyche undergoes as it re-orients its value system and creates meaning out of chaos. The opus beginning with the nigredo (blackening, akin to depression or nihilistic loss of value) in order to descend back into the manipulable prima materia and proceeding through a process of spiritual purification that must unite seemingly irreconcilable opposites (the coniunctio) to achieve new levels of consciousness.

== Part I. Introduction to the Religious and Psychological Problems of Alchemy ==
Jung sets out the central thesis of the book: that Alchemy draws upon a vast array of symbols, images and patterns drawn from the Collective Unconscious. Jung defends his exploration of the Psyche and Soul against various critics who have accused him of being both religious and anti-religious depending on their point of view. He argues for a deeper understanding of the Western spiritual traditions e.g. Esoteric Christianity and Alchemy alongside an examination of the Eastern ones e.g. Buddhism, Hinduism etc. Jung diagnoses the spiritual laziness of the West in not truly embracing the Christian Myth as an inner journey of transformation. Alchemy, he argues, is a 'Western Yoga' which was designed to facilitate this. The book will begin with a description of a whole cycle of dreams described by an unnamed patient (to protect confidentiality) which will be interpreted in their archetypal and mythological sense by Jung. This is designed to illustrate the existence of Jung's theory of the Collective Unconscious and the psychological goal or Great Work of psychic and spiritual integration or wholeness through the individuation process that affects the mind state.

== Part II. Individual Dream Symbolism in Alchemy ==
Jung sets out his agenda and explains his method. The text that follows will contain several cycles of dreams recounted by a patient to a student of Jung. Each dream will be described and then analysed and interpreted with reference to Alchemical imagery and psychoanalytic theory. Jung is at pains to explain that the patient knew nothing of Jung's interpretations and so was not influenced in any way during the dream process.

Jung details an entire cycle of the patient's dreams, summarising the details of each then interpreting them in terms of their parallels with alchemical imagery to reveal their psychological content.

== Part III. Religious Ideas in Alchemy ==
- Chapter 1 - Basic Concepts of Alchemy
- Chapter 2 - The Psychic Nature of Alchemical Work
- Chapter 3 - The Work
- Chapter 4 - The Prima Materia
- Chapter 5 - The Lapis-Christ Parallel
- Chapter 6 - Alchemical Symbolism in the History of Religion

=== Quotations ===
The real mystery does not behave mysteriously or secretively; it speaks a secret language, it adumbrates itself by a variety of images which all indicate its true nature. I am not speaking of a secret personally guarded by someone, with a content known to its possessor, but of a mystery, a matter or circumstance which is "secret," i.e., known only through vague hints but essentially unknown. The real nature of matter was unknown to the alchemist: he knew it only in hints. In seeking to explore it he projected the unconscious into the darkness of matter in order to illuminate it. In order to explain the mystery of matter he projected yet another mystery - his own psychic background -into what was to be explained: Obscurum per obscurius, ignotum per ignotius! This procedure was not, of course, intentional; it was an involuntary occurrence.

I am therefore inclined to assume that the real root of alchemy is to be sought less in philosophical doctrines than in the projections of individual investigators. I mean by this that while working on his chemical experiments the operator had certain psychic experiences which appeared to him as the particular behaviour of the chemical process. Since it was a question of projection, he was naturally unconscious of the fact that the experience had nothing to do with matter itself (that is, with matter as we know it today). He experienced his projection as a property of matter; but what he was in reality experiencing was his own unconscious. In this way he recapitulated the whole history of mankind's knowledge of nature.... Such projections repeat themselves whenever man tries to explore an empty darkness and involuntarily fills it with living form.

— Part 3, Chapter 2.1

When the alchemist speaks of Mercurius, on the face of it he means quicksilver (mercury), but inwardly he means the world-creating spirit concealed or imprisoned in matter. The dragon is probably the oldest pictoral symbol in alchemy of which we have documentary evidence. It appears as the Ouroboros, the tail-eater, in the Codex Marcianus, which dates from the tenth or eleventh century, together with the legend 'the One, the All'. Time and again the alchemists reiterate that the opus proceeds from the one and leads back to the one, that it is a sort of circle like a dragon biting its own tail. For this reason the opus was often called circulare (circular) or else rota (the wheel). Mercurius stands at the beginning and end of the work: he is the prima materia, the caput corvi, the nigredo; as dragon he devours himself and as dragon he dies, to rise again in the lapis. He is the play of colours in the cauda pavonis and the division into the four elements. He is the hermaphrodite that was in the beginning, that splits into the classical brother-sister duality and is reunited in the coniunctio, to appear once again at the end in the radiant form of the lumen novum, the stone. He is metallic yet liquid, matter yet spirit, cold yet fiery, poison and yet healing draught - a symbol uniting all the opposites.

— Part 3, Chapter 3.1

Now, all these myth-pictures represent a drama of the human psyche on the further side of consciousness, showing man as both the one to be redeemed and the redeemer. The first formulation is Christian, the second alchemical. In the first case man attributes the need of redemption to himself and leaves the work of redemption, the actual opus, to the autonomous divine figure; in the latter case man takes upon himself the duty of carrying out the redeeming opus, and attributes the state of suffering and consequent need of redemption to the anima mundi imprisoned in matter. In both cases redemption is a work. In Christianity it is the life and death of the God-man which, by a unique sacrifice, bring about the reconciliation of man, who craves redemption and is sunk in materiality, with God. The mystical effect of the God-man's self-sacrifice extends, broadly speaking, to all men, though it is efficacious only for those who submit through faith or are chosen by divine grace; but in the Pauline acceptance it acts as an apocatastasis and extends also to non-human creation in general, which, in its imperfect state, awaits redemption like the merely natural man.

— Part 3, Chapter 3.3

From this point of view, alchemy seems like a continuation of Christian mysticism carried on in the subterranean darkness of the unconscious.... But this unconscious continuation never reached the surface, where the conscious mind could have dealt with it. All that appeared in consciousness were the symbolic symptoms of the unconscious process. Had the alchemist succeeded in forming any concrete idea of his unconscious contents, he would have been obliged to recognize that he had taken the place of Christ - or, to be more exact, that he, regarded not as ego but as self, had taken over the work of redeeming not man but God. He would then have had to recognize not only himself as the equivalent of Christ, but Christ as a symbol of the self. This tremendous conclusion failed to dawn on the medieval mind.

— Part 3, Chapter 5.1

== Editions ==
- Jung, C. G. 1968. Psychology and Alchemy, Collected Works of C. G. Jung. Princeton, NJ: Princeton University Press. ISBN 978-0-691-09771-8
- Jung, C. G. 1980. Psychology and Alchemy (2nd ed.), Collected Works of C. G. Jung. London: Routledge. ISBN 978-0-415-03452-4
- Jung, C. G. 1980, Psychology and Alchemy Arabic version 2023 Translated by Salma Elsharkawy From ElRawy publishing house (Cover art by Mohammed Derbala)
