= Kristine Mann =

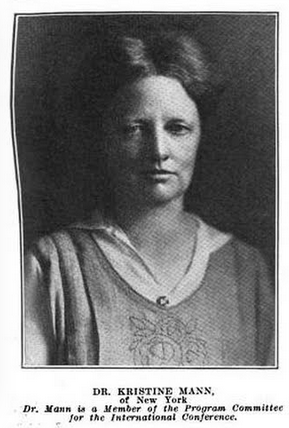
Kristine Mann, from a 1919 publication.

Kristine Mann (August 29, 1873 – 1945) was an American educator and physician, with a particular interest in working women's health. She was an early practitioner of psychoanalysis in North America.

== Early life and education ==
Kristine Mann was born August 29, 1873, in Orange, New Jersey. In 1885 Kristine and her family began spending summers at Bailey Island (Maine), a location that was reminiscent of her mother's native Denmark. Summering at Bailey Island would prove to be a lifelong ritual for Kristine.

Kristine's education began at age four at the Dearborn Morgan School in Orange which she graduated from at age eighteen. In 1891 she entered Smith College receiving an A.B. in 1895. From there she returned to Orange where she helped her father as editor of the New Church Messenger, the official organ of the Swedenborgian General Convention. However, her father's conflicts with the New Church were deepening to the point that in 1897 ties were severed and Mann founded a new society in Elkhart, Indiana, and a new periodical called The Secular Church. Mann was a follower of Henry James Sr., whose anti-ecclesiastical approach had brought him into conflict with the New Church in Chicago, resulting in the family moving to Orange. Thus Kristine grew up in a somewhat unorthodox New Church family setting.

She began the study of anatomy at Women's Medical School in 1907 she entered Cornell Medical School receiving her medical degree in 1913. At Cornell she met Eleanor Bertine who would become a lifelong friend and colleague.

== Teaching career and interest in women's health ==
Kristine Mann remained in Orange, teaching science at the Dearborn Morgan School. In 1899 she went to Berlin, Germany, to teach English and ancient history in the Willard School for American Girls. She became proficient in German there and attended lectures in science and literature at the Berlin University. On her return home in 1900 she went to the University of Michigan where she received a Master of Arts degree. From there she went on to teach English for four years at Vassar College then several years in New York, New York, teaching at the Brearley School while pursuing graduate studies in education, philosophy, and psychology at Columbia University.

At this point in her career she became very concerned about women's health issues and came to believe strongly in better health education for women. She taught in the Physical Education Training School of Wellesley College, having charge of corrective exercises and freshman hygiene.

In 1911 Mann had returned to New York to begin a two-year investigation of health conditions of saleswomen for the New York Department Store Education Association, and after the beginning of World War I joined the United States Army Ordnance Department supervising the health of women in munition plants. After the Armistice she joined the Work Council of the Y.W.C.A. where she traveled the United States lecturing and putting on health demonstrations at educational institutions. In 1920 she went on to become director of the Health Center for Business and Industrial Women in New York.

== Jungian psychology ==
At Vassar College Mann developed lifelong friendships with three of her students, Cary Fink, Elizabeth Goodrich and Eleanor Bertine, who like Mann, all played major roles in the early history of analytical psychology. In 1920 Bertine traveled to London, England, to begin analysis with Constance Long, the first British psychoanalyst to follow Jung's methods. Long had studied with Jung at his home in Kusnacht, and this encounter lead Mann and Bertine to travel to Zürich from 1921 to 1922. They then returned to New York, New York, where they established their own practices, becoming the second and third Jungians to treat patients in the United States. They became staunch allies of Jung and regularly traveled to Europe to attend his lectures and to continue their analysis with him. A small determined band of Jungians emerged in New York, and in 1924 Mary Esther Harding, a distinguished disciple of Jung, emigrated from England to join them.

Beginning around 1918 Jung wrote that Christianity had suppressed the animal element in the human psyche, and as a result when it broke out it was uncontrolled and unregulated. This inevitably lead to catastrophe, such as with World War I. In 1923 after his interactions with Mann (1921–1922), Jung spoke of the historical effects of Ecclesiastical Christianity upon the unconscious mind. Jung's critique of Christianity was now limited to Ecclesiastical Christianity, which he now approached with greater scrutiny.

Mann, Harding and Bertine spent summers at Mann's ancestral summer community at Bailey Island (Maine) where they established their practices in the summer and saw patients from all parts of the United States. In 1936 Jung traveled to Bailey Island to present his Bailey Island Seminar, the first of his two part American seminar Dream Symbols. The second part, known as his New York Seminar was held in New York one year later. The Dreamer in this seminar has been identified as the prominent physicist Wolfgang Pauli, and the seminars were published in volume 12 of Jung's Collected Works as Individual Dream Symbolism in Relation to Alchemy.

The three women doctors created a powerful trio. In 1936 they created the Analytical Psychology Club of New York and actively lead the educational programs there. At her death in 1945 Mann left her personal library to the Club, the beginning of the Kristine Mann Library that is now the most extensive collection in analytical psychology in the world.

== Namesakes ==
- The Kristine Mann Library: the oldest and largest Jungian library in North America, it is located at East 39th Street in Manhattan inside the C.G. Jung Center and houses over 20,000 volumes related to Jung and analytical psychology as well as adjacent subjects like dreams, mythology and alchemy.
- The Kristine Mann Library Research Award: Administered by the Kristine Mann Library, the award is a prestigious prize meant to encourage scholarship in the field of analytical psychology. It consists of $4,000 distributed over two years.

== Publications ==
- Kristine Mann, "Thousands of 'Well' Women Pay for Training Health Center", New York Times, Section 8, Page 15 (April 1, 1923)
- Kristine Mann, "The Shadow of Death", Papers of the Analytical Psychology Club of New York, 4 (1940)
- Kristine Mann, "The Self-Analysis of Emanuel Swedenborg", Papers of the Analytical Psychology Club of New York, 4 (1940)
