= Personal unconscious =

Concept in Jungian psychoanalysis

In analytical psychology, the personal unconscious is a Jungian term referring to the part of the unconscious that can be brought to the conscious mind. It is Carl Jung's equivalent to the Freudian unconscious, in contrast to the Jungian concept of the collective unconscious. Often referred by him as "No man's land," the personal unconscious is located at the fringe of consciousness, between two worlds: "the exterior or spatial world and the interior or psychic objective world" (Ellenberger, 707). As Charles Baudouin states, "That the unconscious extends so far beyond consciousness is simply the counterpart of the fact that the exterior world extends so far beyond our visual field" (Ellenberger, 707).

The personal unconscious is made up of both memories that are easily brought to mind and those that have been forgotten or repressed. Jung's theory of a personal unconscious is quite similar to Freud's creation of a region containing a person's repressed, forgotten or ignored experiences. However, Jung considered the personal unconscious to be a "more or less superficial layer of the unconscious." Within the personal unconscious are what he called "feeling-toned complexes." He said that "they constitute the personal and private side of psychic life."
