= Two Essays on Analytical Psychology =

1967 book by Carl Gustav Jung

- 1966 Bollingen paperback edition
- Author: Carl G. Jung
- Series: The Collected Works of C. G. Jung
- Published: 1967

Two Essays on Analytical Psychology is volume 7 of The Collected Works of C. G. Jung, presenting the core of Carl Jung's views about psychology. Known as one of the best introductions to Jung's work, the volumes includes the essays "The Relations between the Ego and the Unconscious" (1928; 2nd edn., 1935) and "On the Psychology of the Unconscious" (1943).

Historically, the essays mark the end of Jung's close association with Sigmund Freud, showing his attempt to integrate the work of Freud and Alfred Adler into a comprehensive framework. To show the development of his thinking, an appendix in later editions also includes original versions of the essays "New Paths in Psychology" (1912) and "The Structure of the Unconscious" (1916)—both of which were discovered after Jung's death.

Extensive detailed abstracts of each chapter are available online.

== "On The Psychology of the Unconscious" ==
The first section, On the Psychology of the Unconscious, includes these chapters:

1. Psychoanalysis
2. The Eros Theory
3. The Other Point of View: The Will to Power
4. The Problem of the Attitude-Type
5. The Personal and the Collective Unconscious
6. The Synthetic or Constructive Method
7. The Archetypes of the Collective Unconscious
8. General Remarks on the Therapeutic Approach
9. Conclusion.

=== Sections 1-3 ===
Jung uses the first three parts of this essay to place his psychological school in the intellectual tradition of Friedrich Nietzsche, Pierre Janet, Sigmund Freud, and Alfred Adler. Jung gives a brief account of the historical development of Psychoanalysis, particularly Freud and Breuer's case history of Anna O, and covers some of Freud's early theorizing on neurosis, the unconscious, dream interpretation, wish fulfillment, and the incest-wish of the Oedipus Complex.

While Freud explained neurosis through sexual motivations, Adler explained those same conflicts as arising from a power principle. Jung addresses Adler's concepts of superiority/inferiority and compensation and Nietzsche's writings on the will to power.

=== Sections 4-8 ===
Jung moves to introduce his own theories by claiming that both Freud and Adler are largely correct, but that each of their theories interprets the world from the point-of-view of a particular temperament. Jung uses this as an example of his theory of personality types and the distinction between introversion and extraversion.

Next Jung looks at the problem of transference in the therapeutic context and posits that there is more than infantile personal unconscious content being projected: there are archetypal patterns of behavior and fantasy imagery. Jung distinguishes the personal unconscious (which he relates to his concept of the shadow) from the collective unconscious, which he describes variously in this essay as containing "primordial images," "inherited possibilities of human imagination," "thought-forms," "motifs," "dominants," and "archetypes." Jung explains that archetypes have a powerful emotional fascination akin to a religious experience.

Jung elaborates on his theories by going through some examples of his method of dream interpretation, and amplifying the material provided by connecting it with archetypal figures such as the shadow, the magician/wise old man, and the hero undertaking the night sea journey. Jung maintains that there is great healing potential in a thoughtful integration of the unconscious.

== "The Relations Between the Ego and the Unconscious" ==
The second essay, The Relations Between the Ego and the Unconscious, is split into two parts: the first broadly is about the risks of a confrontation with the collective unconscious; and the second part is about Jung's method for a more constructive engagement with this psychic material.

This section includes:

1. The Effects of the Unconscious Upon the Conscious
  - The Personal and the Collective Unconscious
  - Phenomena Resulting from the Assimilation of the Unconscious
  - The Persona as a Segment of the Collective Psyche
  - Negative Attempts to Free the Individuality from the Collective Psyche
2. Individuation
  - The Function of the Unconscious. Anima and Animus
  - The Technique of Differentiation between the Ego and the Figures of the Unconscious
  - The Mana-Personality

=== Part One – The Effects of the Unconscious Upon Consciousness ===
Jung gives some examples of how consciousness becomes "inflated," which he defines as "an extension of the personality beyond individual limits, in other words, a state of being puffed up." This runs the gamut between megalomania and self-abnegation. Jung stresses the importance of maintaining the distinction between the personal and the collective, to maintain the integrity of the individual personality and allow it to grow in the individuation process.

Next, Jung defines his concept of the persona, the social roles that a person performs, as a segment of the collective psyche that is incorrectly felt to be personal. Jung advises that people should free their individuality from the collective psyche but gives several examples of the dangers inherent in this process.

Jung goes through the problem of a collapse of the conscious attitude, which he calls a return to the original chaos. Different suboptimal resolutions to this crisis are explored, including a "regressive restoration of the persona," which is a retreat to a mode of being that one has already outgrown and an avoidance of future growth and risk. Another partial solution is called "identification with the collective psyche," where the collapsed ego allows itself to be swallowed by the unconscious. Jung points out that this is the beginning of the renewal process of the hero's journey but that people can lose themselves in the belly of the whale.

=== Part Two – Individuation ===
Jung calls individuation a "coming to selfhood" and "self-realization." He says that "the aim of individuation is nothing less than to divest oneself of the false wrappings of the persona on the one hand and of the suggestive power of primordial images on the other." Jung posits that the function of the unconscious is to compensate the conscious attitude, and that the two systems together form a totality called The Self.

The individuation process involves allowing the unconscious to communicate with consciousness, and one main channel by which that happens is through a dream figure that is contra-sexual to the ego. Jung describes the anima as a means of relating to the unconscious, just as the persona is a means of relating to society. Jung provides some case studies to illustrate his 'technique of differentiation between the ego and the figures of the unconscious' and encourages the active production of fantasy imagery in his patients as a way of integrating the unconscious.

Jung describes how integrating the anima with the ego fills the ego with a sort of magical knowledge (mana), and this state of ego inflation is described as possession by the archetype of the magician (the mana personality). Jung advises cultivating a second, superordinate center of personality, away from the ego yet not completely unconscious, which Jung calls the Self, as a container for this psychic energy from the unconscious.
