= Modern Man in Search of a Soul =

1933 book by Carl Gustav Jung

- First edition
- Author: Carl Jung
- Translator: Cary F. Baynes with William Stanley Dell
- Language: German, English
- Subject: Psychology
- Published: 1933 Kegan Paul, Trench, Trubner and Co, London (English)
- Media type: Print
- Pages: 282 (1st edition)
- ISBN: 0-15-661206-2 (Mariner Books edition)

Modern Man in Search of a Soul (Seelenprobleme der Gegenwart) is a book of psychological essays written by Swiss psychologist Carl Jung.

== Background ==
In the years preceding this publication, Jung had experienced several dramatic shifts. After the Bugishu Psychological Expedition through East Africa with George Beckwith, Helton Godwin Baynes, and Ruth Bailey, Jung returned to Zürich and focused on the lecture format of his English seminars at the Psychological Club - eventually attracting a new group of international followers. In addition to expanding his academic following, Jung's psychiatric practice also rapidly grew taking on notable patients like Mary Foote and Thornton Wilder. During this period in Zürich, Jung struck up a friendship with Wolfgang Ernst Pauli.

In the translators' preface Cary F. Baynes provides some background to the material:

With one exception, all the essays which make up this volume have been delivered as lectures. The German texts of four of them have been brought out in separate publications and the others are to be found in a volume [Seelenprobleme der Gegenwart] together with several other essays which have already appeared in English.

Jung's various presentations to the Psychological Club in Zürich in this period, notably his 1932 seminar on Kundalini yoga, have been widely regarded as a milestone in the psychological understanding of Eastern thought. Kundalini yoga presented Jung with a model for the development of higher consciousness, and he interpreted its symbols in terms of the process of individuation.

== Summary ==
The writing covers a broad array of subjects such as gnosticism, theosophy, Eastern philosophy, and spirituality in general. The first part of the book deals with dream analysis in its practical application, the problems and aims of modern psychotherapy, and also his own theory of psychological types. The middle section addresses Jung's beliefs about the stages of life and archaic man. He also contrasts his own theories with those of Sigmund Freud.

In the latter parts of the book, Jung discusses psychology and literature and devotes a chapter to basic postulates of analytical psychology. The last two chapters are devoted to the spiritual problem of modern man in aftermath of World War I. He compares it to the flowering of gnosticism in the 2nd century C.E. and investigates how psychotherapists are like clergy.
