= Maria Moltzer =

Dutch-Swiss psychologist and psychotherapist

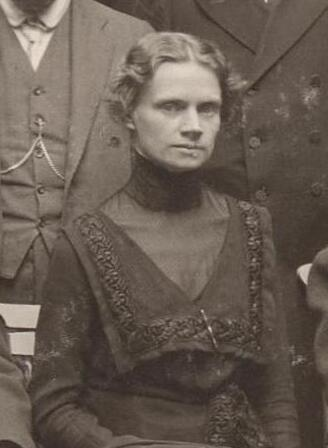
- Moltzer (age 37) in 1911 at Sigmund Freud's IPA Congress, Weimar Germany
- Born: 6 January 1874; Amsterdam, Netherlands
- Died: 6 December 1944 (aged 70); Zürich, Switzerland
- Citizenship: Dutch-Swiss
- Known for: Intuition psychological type
- Scientific career
- Fields: Psychiatry; psychology
- Workplaces: Burgerziekenhuis (Amsterdam), Lebendige Kraft (Zurich)

Maria Johanna Moltzer (Amsterdam, 6 January 1874 – Zürich, 6 December 1944) was a Dutch-Swiss psychoanalyst.

She was a significant early collaborator of Carl Jung. Moltzer was credited as the initial inspiration for Jung's formulation of the anima archetype (Note: Sonu Shamdasani describes in Cult Fictions: C.G. Jung and the Founding of Analytical Psychology: "I have elsewhere suggested that the case for Maria Moltzer (of whom more later) being the woman in question is significantly stronger than that for Sabina Spielrein, as has been commonly argued.") and the discovery of the intuitive type made famous by Jung in Psychological Types.

== Early years ==
Moltzer grew up in Amsterdam, in a wealthy and prosperous family. Her father, Christiaan Nicolaas Jacob Moltzer, was the director of the Bols distillery and was active in politics and society. After Moltzer's early education, she was trained as a nurse at the Burgerziekenhuis on Linnaeusstraat. She also attended lectures in Law and Literature at the University of Lausanne in Switzerland.

== Career ==
After her studies in 1905, Moltzer began working as head nurse in the Lebendige Kraft (Living Power) sanatorium in Zürich. There, she brought a holistic approach (a healthy mind in a healthy body). Moltzer took her specializations further: in the psychological causes of physical problems, in children with eating disorders, and from 1911 she had a private clinical practice where she treated many artists.

At the beginning of 1910, Moltzer met Carl Jung, when he was in his early collaboration with Sigmund Freud. Moltzer became Jung's assistant, and soon took over patients from him. During the 1913 break with Freud, she continued supporting Jung. In or around 1911, she described her understanding of intuition as "grown out of instinct. I consider intuition to be the differentiation and conscious function of instinct." In The Aftermath, Ernst Falzeder discusses Sonu Shamdasani's research, identifying Jung's final casting of intuition as both overlapping but also a significant re-working of Moltzer's original related framework.

In 1918, she broke with Jung, after finding her contributions not sufficiently recognized and credited.

Later, Moltzer wrote "Am Umbruch der Zeit," later published as "Der Weg zur Mitte."

Moltzer died after a long illness in Zurich.

== Posthumous papers ==
More of her work has been recognized and published by Shamdasani in his 1998 work The Lost Contributions of Maria Moltzer: Two Unknown Papers.

In a review, a scholarly investigation has been discussed, undertaken by Shamdasani to identify characteristics of Moltzer's thought and writing as distinctly different to Jung. This investigation was on a document created from an early lecture by Jung, the content which has been used in 1990s and since, to prop-up a maligned contemporary view and create new controversy.

== Publications ==
- Maria Moltzer (1948). Der Weg zur Mitte Ein Gleichnis in Träumen (in German). Amsterdam: Van Holkema & Warendorf. OCLC 72287026.
