= Answer to Job =

1952 book by Carl Gustav Jung

- Author: Carl Jung
- Original title: Antwort auf Hiob
- Translator: R. F. C. Hull (1973)
- Language: German
- Genre: Analytical psychology, theology
- Published: 1952
- English publication date: 1954
- Pages: 169 (1952 ed.)

Answer to Job (German: Antwort auf Hiob) is a 1952 book by Carl Jung that addresses the significance of the Book of Job to the "divine drama" of Christianity. It argues that though he submitted to Yahweh's omnipotence, Job nevertheless proved to be more moral and conscious than God, who was incited by Satan to torment Job without justification. This scandal necessitated God to become united with man. Satan was banished from heaven, and God incarnated as purely good through a virgin birth, into the sinless redeemer Jesus Christ. Eventually, however, God will also incarnate his evil side. For this to happen, the Holy Spirit left by Christ on earth has to enter "empirical" and sinful human beings, in whom the divine can be realized completely. Jung turns to the Book of Ezekiel, the Book of Enoch, and especially the Book of Revelation to consider how this may unfold. He suggests that the contemporary modern era, in which humanity possesses immense technological power, is significant to this second divine birth. He interprets the 1950 papal dogma of the Assumption of Mary as easing this transition toward completeness by re-emphasizing the feminine dimension of God.

The book was first published in English in 1954. It has been criticized, admired, and highlighted as a major work by figures such as author Joyce Carol Oates and theologian John Shelby Spong.

== Summary ==
Jung considers the Book of Job a landmark development in the "divine drama", for the first time contemplating criticism of God (Gotteskritik). Jung described Answer to Job as "pure poison", referring to the controversial nature of the book.

The basic thesis of the book is that God has a good side and a fourth side—the evil face of God. This view is inevitably controversial, but Jung claimed it is backed up by references to the Hebrew Bible. Jung saw this evil side of God as the missing fourth element of the Trinity, which he believed should be supplanted by a Quaternity. However, he also discusses in the book whether the true missing fourth element is the feminine side of God. He saw the dogmatic definition of the Assumption of the Virgin Mary by Pope Pius XII in 1950 as being the most significant religious event since the Reformation.

Another theme in the book is the inversion of the biblical assertion that God sent his son Christ to die for the sins of humanity. Jung maintains that upon realizing his mistreatment of Job, God sends his son to humankind to be sacrificed in repentance for God's sins. Jung sees this as a sign of God's ongoing psychological development.

== Reception ==
Author Joyce Carol Oates described Answer to Job in her review "Legendary Jung" as Jung's most important work. The Episcopal Bishop and humanist Christian author John Shelby Spong also considers it to be Jung's "most profound work".

Jungian scholar Murray Stein claims Jung viewed the Book of Job as an example of a scriptural religious experience:

In Jung's interpretation, Job is completely innocent. He is a scrupulously pious man who follows all the religious conventions, and for most of his life, he is blessed with good fortune. This is the expected outcome for a just man in a rationally ordered universe. But then God allows Satan to work on him, bringing misfortune and misery. Being overwhelmed with questions and images of divine majesty and power, Job is then silenced. He realizes his inferior position vis-a-vis the Almighty. But he also retains his personal integrity, and this so impresses God that He is forced to take stock of Himself. Perhaps He is not so righteous after all!

Marc Fonda observed that God's omniscience precludes self-awareness. Being omniscient, God has no concentrated self to speak of. Being a part of everything, God has no opportunity to distinguish self from non-self. However, as God knows the thoughts of humans, through the thoughts of his creation he can experience what self-awareness is. Murray continues:

And out of this astonishing self-reflection, induced in God by Job's stubborn righteousness, He, the Almighty, is pushed into a process of transformation that leads eventually to His incarnation as Jesus. God develops empathy and love through his confrontation with Job, and out of it a new relationship between God and humankind is born.

== Editions ==
- Jung, C. G. (1952). Antwort auf Hiob (Original German edition) (in German). Zürich: Rascher.
- Jung, C. G. (1954). Answer to Job (First English edition). Translated by R. F. C. Hull. London: Routledge and Kegan Paul.
- Jung, C. G. (1973). Psychology and Religion: West and East. The Collected Works of C. G. Jung. Vol. 11. Translated by R. F. C. Hull. Princeton, New Jersey: Princeton University Press. ISBN 0-691-01785-9.
