= Psychology of the Unconscious =

1912 book by Carl Gustav Jung

- Author: Carl Jung
- Original title: Wandlungen und Symbole der Libido
- Translator: Beatrice M. Hinkle
- Language: German
- Published: 1912
- English publication date: 1916
- Media type: Print
- ISBN: 0-691-01815-4

Psychology of the Unconscious (German: Wandlungen und Symbole der Libido) is an early work of Carl Jung, first published in the Jahrbuch für Psychoanalytische und Psychopathologische Forschungen in two installments (vol. III, 1911; and vol. IV, 1912). The English translation by Beatrice M. Hinkle appeared in 1916 under the full title of Psychology of the Unconscious: a study of the transformations and symbolisms of the libido, a contribution to the history of the evolution of thought (London: Kegan Paul Trench Trubner). Hinkle's translation was reissued in 1992, as supplementary volume B to The Collected Works of C. G. Jung.

In 1952, Jung published a thoroughly revised version of the work, which was translated into English in 1956 as Symbols of Transformation, reissued as volume five of the Collected Works.

The book illustrates a theoretical divergence between Jung and Freud on the nature of the libido, and its publication led to a break in the friendship between the two men, both stating that the other was unable to admit he could possibly be wrong.

== Overview ==
According to Jung, his work is an "extended commentary on a practical analysis of the prodromal stages of schizophrenia."

The analysis is of the Miller Fantasies; the fantasies of Miss Frank Miller, an American woman Jung did not know, but whose writings he had encountered in the work of Théodore Flournoy.

Jung wrote in his 1924 edition of the book that Miller's unusual name was a "pseudonym," which it was not. Miller, named for her father, was an Alabama-born performer and lecturer who often gave "speeches" in character as various cultural and historical figures. Flournoy published a few of her most vivid historic fantasies, with her own comments and impressions, in 1905 with an introduction by himself. Jung explains their crucially significant mythological content and portending influence, declaring that Miller exhibited signs of "prodromal" stages of schizophrenia, and predicting that she would eventually suffer a schizophrenic breakdown. Jung was wrong; although Miller would indeed later receive psychiatric treatment, it was not for a diagnosis of schizophrenia.

The Miller Fantasies are included as an appendix in Symbols of Transformation.

Jung would later acknowledge that in closely delving into the Miller Fantasies, he was in fact—without admitting it to himself—trying to analyze the same critical questions about his own psyche.
