= The Collected Works of C. G. Jung =

Book series compiling the works of Carl Jung

- Vol 15. Spirit in Man, Art, and Literature.
- Edited by: Herbert Read, Michael Fordham, and Gerhard Adler
- Original title: Gesammelte Werke
- Translator: R. F. C. Hull
- Publisher: Princeton University Press (US); Routledge & Kegan Paul (UK)
- No. of books: 20

The Collected Works of C. G. Jung (German: Gesammelte Werke) is a book series containing the first collected edition, in English translation, of the major writings of Swiss psychiatrist Carl Gustav Jung.

The twenty volumes, including a Bibliography and a General Index, were translated from the original German by R.F.C. Hull, under the editorship of Sir Herbert Read, Michael Fordham and Gerhard Adler. The works consist of published volumes, essays, lectures, letters, and a dissertation written by Jung from 1902 until his death in 1961. The compilation by the documentary editors dates from 1945 onward. The series contains revised versions of works previously published, works not previously translated, and new translations of many of Jung's writings. Several of the volumes are extensively illustrated; each contains an index and most contain a bibliography. Until his death, Jung supervised the revisions of the text, some of which were extensive. A body of Jung's work still remains unpublished.

Princeton University Press published these volumes in the United States as part of its Bollingen Series of books. Routledge & Kegan Paul published them independently in the United Kingdom. In general, the Princeton editions are not available for sale in The Commonwealth, except for Canada, and the Routledge editions are not available for sale in the US. There are many differences in publication dates between the Princeton and Routledge series, as well as some differences in edition numbers and the styling of titles; there are also various hardback and paperback versions, as well as some ebooks, available from both publishers, each with its own ISBN. This article shows dates and titles for hardback (cloth) volumes in the catalog of the Princeton University Press, which also includes paperback and ebook versions. Information about the Routledge series can be found in its own catalogue.

A digital edition, complete except for the General Index in Volume 20, is also available. Both the individual volumes and the complete set are fully searchable.

== In the Bollingen Series ==
=== Volumes ===
Princeton University Press published these volumes in the United States as part of its Bollingen Series of books. The Routledge series includes the same volumes with the same numbers, but with many different publication dates and some minor variations in the styling of titles.

The series includes 20 volumes, one of them published in two parts; detailed chapter-by-chapter abstracts of each volume are available online.

Volume 1 – Psychiatric Studies (1957)
Volume 2 – Experimental Researches (1973)
Volume 3 – Psychogenesis of Mental Disease (1960)
Volume 4 – Freud & Psychoanalysis (1961)
Volume 5 – Symbols of Transformation (1967; a revision of Psychology of the Unconscious, 1912)
Volume 6 – Psychological Types (1971)
Volume 7 – Two Essays on Analytical Psychology (1967)
Volume 8 – Structure & Dynamics of the Psyche (1969)
Volume 9 (Part 1) – Archetypes and the Collective Unconscious (1969)
Volume 9 (Part 2) – Aion: Researches into the Phenomenology of the Self (1969)
Volume 10 – Civilization in Transition (1970)
Volume 11 – Psychology and Religion: West and East (1970)
Volume 12 – Psychology and Alchemy (1968)
Volume 13 – Alchemical Studies (1968)
Volume 14 – Mysterium Coniunctionis (1970)
Volume 15 – Spirit in Man, Art, and Literature (1966)
Volume 16 – Practice of Psychotherapy (1966)
Volume 17 – Development of Personality (1954)
Volume 18 – The Symbolic Life (1977)
Volume 19 – General Bibliography (Revised Edition) (1990)
Volume 20 – General Index (1979)

=== Additional content ===
In addition to the 20-volume Collected Works, the following titles are also included as part of the Bollingen Series:

- Supplementary Volume A – The Zofingia Lectures
- Supplementary Volume B – The Psychology of the Unconscious (first version of Symbols of Transformation)
- Analytical Psychology: Notes of the Seminars Given in 1925
- Dream Analysis: Notes of the Seminars Given in 1928–30
- Visions: Notes on the Seminars Given in 1930–34
- The Psychology of Kundalini Yoga. Notes of the Seminar Given in 1932
- Nietzsche's Zarathustra: Notes of the Seminars Given in 1934–39: Vol 1
- Nietzsche's Zarathustra: Notes of the Seminars Given in 1934–39: Vol 2
- Children's Dreams. Notes from the Seminar Given in 1936–1940
- Synchronicity: An Acausal Connecting Principle

== Vol 1. Psychiatric Studies ==
Psychiatric Studies, volume 1 in The Collected Works, contains Jung's papers written between 1902 and 1905, focusing on descriptive and experimental psychiatry from his early days in medical practice. They show the influence on Jung of Eugen Bleuler and Pierre Janet.

The book begins with Jung's doctoral dissertation "On the Psychology and Pathology of So-Called Occult Phenomena", a case study of an adolescent girl who claimed to be a psychic medium. It also includes papers on cryptomnesia, Freudian slips in reading, simulated insanity, and other subjects, and discusses some conditions of inferiority and altered states of consciousness which were previously thought to be occult phenomena. Included are case studies of sleepwalkers and patients who had hypomania.

The papers in this volume were edited by Sir Herbert Read, Michael Fordham and Gerhard Adler.

=== Editions ===
- 1957. 1st ed. Princeton, New Jersey: Princeton University Press. ISBN 978-1-400-85090-7.
- 1970. 2nd ed. London: Routledge. ISBN 978-0-415-09896-0.

== Vol 2. Experimental Researches ==
Experimental Researches, volume 2 in The Collected Works, edited by Gerhard Adler, includes Jung's word association studies in normal and abnormal psychology; two 1909 Clark University lectures on the association method; and three articles on psychophysical researches from American and English journals in 1907 and 1908.

The word association studies described in this book were an important contribution to diagnostic psychology and psychiatry, and show the influence on Jung of Eugen Bleuler and Sigmund Freud.

== Vol 3. Psychogenesis of Mental Disease ==
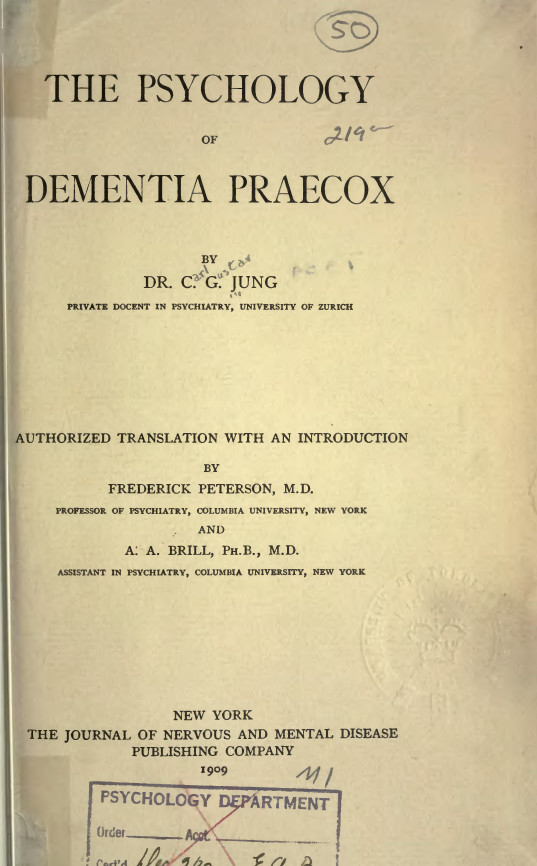
The Psychology of Dementia Praecox (1909)

Psychogenesis of Mental Disease, volume 3 in The Collected Works, shows the development of Jung's thoughts about the nature of mental illness, and established him as a pioneer and scientific contributor to psychiatry.

It contains "On the Psychology of Dementia Praecox" (1907), which Abraham Brill described as "indispensable for every student of psychiatry;" as well as nine other papers in psychiatry, all of which demonstrating Jung's original thinking about the origins of mental illness and give insight into the development of his later concepts such as the archetypes and the collective unconscious. Among the latter nine works, "The Content of the Psychoses" (1908) and two papers from 1956 and 1958, respectively, discuss Jung's conclusions after long experience in the psychotherapy of schizophrenia.

This volume was edited and translated from German by Read, Hull, and Adler.

=== Editions ===
- 1960. Princeton, New Jersey: Princeton University Press. ISBN 978-0-691-09769-5.
- 1992. London: Routledge. ISBN 978-0-415-07175-8.

== Vol 4. Freud & Psychoanalysis ==
Freud & Psychoanalysis, volume 4 in The Collected Works, contains most of Jung's published writings on Sigmund Freud and psychoanalysis from 1906–1916, with two papers from later years. The former period extends from the time of enthusiastic collaboration between Jung and Freud, through that when Jung's growing appreciation of religious experience and his criticism of Freud's emphasis on psychopathology led to their final break. Subjects covered include Freud's theory of hysteria, the analysis of dreams, the theory of psychoanalysis, and more.

The Times Literary Supplement said that "This volume is an excellent introduction into Jungian theories and demonstrates their fundamental differences from psychoanalysis. It also makes it understandable that Jung was often called a mystic even at the early stage of the development of his theories", and that this "volume will furnish excellent source material for historians interested in the gradual parting of the ways in the developing ideas of these two giants. An excellent introduction into Jungian theories..."

=== Editions ===
- 1961. Princeton, New Jersey: Princeton University Press. ISBN 978-0-691-09765-7
- 1961. London: Routledge. ISBN 978-0-415-09446-7.

== Vol 5. Symbols of Transformation ==
Symbols of Transformation, volume 5 in The Collected Works, is a complete revision of Psychology of the Unconscious (1911–12), Jung's first important statement of his independent position in psychology.

In 1911, Jung said that the book "laid down a programme to be followed for the next few decades of my life." It covers many and varied fields of study, including among others: psychiatry, psychoanalysis, ethnology, and comparative religion. It became a standard work and was translated into Spanish, Portuguese, French, Dutch and Italian as well as English. Its somewhat misleading title in English was The Psychology of the Unconscious. In the foreword to Symbols of Transformation, Jung wrote:

it was the explosion of all those psychic contents which could find no room, no breathing space, in the constricting atmosphere of Freudian psychology.... It was an attempt, only partially successful, to create a wider setting for medical psychology and to bring the whole of the psychic phenomena within its purview.

The book contains material on directed thinking vs. associative thinking (dreaming), the Hieros gamos, and extensive analysis of the fantasies of a Miss Frank Miller, including the symbols of the hero, mother, and sacrifice.

=== Editions ===
- 1956. London: Routledge. ISBN 978-0-415-13637-2.
- 1967. Princeton, New Jersey: Princeton University Press. ISBN 978-0-691-09775-6.

== Vol 8. Structure & Dynamics of the Psyche ==
Structure & Dynamics of the Psyche, volume 8 in The Collected Works, is a revised translation of one of Jung's most important longer works. There is an appendix of four shorter papers on personality type, published between 1913 and 1935.

This volume traces an important line of development in Jung's thought from 1912 onwards. It first elaborates Freud's concept of sexual libido into Jung's own concept: psychic energy. Then it shows how Jung slowly arrived at a concept even more controversial than psychic energy was in its day: psychic reality. The book has Jung's first mention of the archetype, as well as his later views on its nature. There is also a 1916 essay on the therapeutic uses of active imagination.

Several important chapters elucidate Jung's ideas on synchronicity, which were later published separately as Synchronicity: An Acausal Connecting Principle.

=== Editions ===
- 1970. London: Routledge. ISBN 978-0-415-06581-8.
- 1970. Princeton, New Jersey: Princeton University Press. ISBN 978-0-691-09774-9.

== Vol 9. Part 1 and 2 ==
=== Part 1 – Archetypes and the Collective Unconscious ===
Archetypes and the Collective Unconscious is part 1 of volume 9 in The Collected Works, and includes numerous full-color illustrations. In this volume, Jung's theory is first established through three essays, followed by essays on specific archetypes, and finally a section relating them to the process of individuation.

The Journal of Analytical Psychology calls this volume:

An eloquent witness to Jung's greatness of mind and heart. His idea of the archetype involves profound attitudes towards man's existence and intimates values through which very many people have found a new significance in their lives.

==== Editions ====
- 1969. 1st ed. Princeton, New Jersey: Princeton University Press. ISBN 978-0-691-09761-9
- 1991. 2nd ed. London: Routledge. ISBN 978-0-415-05139-2.

=== Part 2 – Aion: Researches into the Phenomenology of the Self ===
Aion: Researches into the Phenomenology of the Self, part 2 of volume 9 in The Collected Works, was originally published in German (1951), and is a major work of Jung's later years.

Its central theme is the symbolic representation of the psychic totality through the concept of the Self, whose traditional historical equivalent is the figure of Christ. Jung demonstrates his thesis by an investigation of the Christian fish symbol, and of Gnostic and alchemical symbolism. He regards these as phenomena of cultural assimilation. Chapters on the ego, the shadow, and the anima and animus, provide a valuable summary of these elementary concepts in Jungian psychology.

Much in this volume is concerned with the rise of Christianity and with the figure of Christ. Jung explores how Christianity came into being when it did, the importance of the figure of Christ, and the identification of that figure with the archetype of the Self. The book also discusses the problem of opposites, particularly good and evil.

==== Editions ====
- 1969. Princeton, New Jersey: Princeton University Press. ISBN 978-0-691-09759-6.
- 1991. 2nd ed. London: Routledge. ISBN 978-0-415-06476-7.

== Vol 10. Civilization in Transition ==
Civilization in Transition, volume 10 in The Collected Works, contains essays bearing on the contemporary scene during the 1920s–1930s, and on the relation of the individual to society. It includes papers focusing on the upheaval in Germany, and two major works of Jung's last years, "The Undiscovered Self" (1957) and "Flying Saucers".

In the first paper, Jung theorizes that the European conflict was essentially a psychological crisis originating in the collective unconscious of individuals. He gave this theory a much wider application, for example, in "Flying Saucers", about the origins of a myth which he regarded as compensating the scientistic trends of the present technological era. An appendix contains documents relating to Jung's association with the International General Medical Society for Psychotherapy.

=== Editions ===
- 1964. London: Routledge. ISBN 978-0-415-06579-5.
- 1970. Princeton, New Jersey: Princeton University Press. ISBN 978-0-691-09762-6.

== Vol 11. Psychology and Religion: West and East ==
Psychology and Religion: West and East, volume 11 in The Collected Works, contains sixteen studies in religious phenomena, including "Psychology and Religion" and "Answer to Job".

The New York Times Book Review said of the book:

Nowhere else than in this study of the interplay of East and West is the point so forcefully made that man's cultural past somehow molds his feelings and thinking as well as his highly contrasting attitudes toward reality.

=== Editions ===
- 1970. Princeton, New Jersey: Princeton University Press. ISBN 978-0-691-09772-5.
- 1970. London: Routledge. ISBN 978-0-415-06606-8.

== Vol 14. Mysterium Coniunctionis ==
Mysterium Coniunctionis, subtitled An Inquiry into the Separation and Synthesis of Psychic Opposites in Alchemy, was published in 1955-56 in German, and in 1963 in English. The definitive edition, Volume 14 in The Collected Works, was published in 1970 by Princeton University Press in the US and by Routledge and Kegan Paul in the UK. Completed in his 81st year, it is Jung's last major work on the synthesis of opposites in alchemy and psychology.

The book – with ten plates, a bibliography, an index, and an appendix of original Latin and Greek texts quoted – provides a final account of Jung's lengthy researches in alchemy. He empirically discovered that certain key problems of modern man were prefigured in what the alchemists called their "art" or "process." Edward F. Edinger poses an important question in the introduction to his book The Mystery of The Conjunctio:

One might ask, why alchemy? ... The alchemists were fired with the beginnings of the modern spirit of inquiry, but yet, as investigators of the nature of matter they were still half asleep. So, in their zeal to investigate those newly opened vistas, they projected their fantasies and dream images into matter. In effect, they dreamed a vast collective dream using chemical operations and materials as imagery and subject matter for that dream. Alchemy is that great collective dream, and what makes it so important for us is that it's the dream of our ancestors. The alchemists were rooted in the Western psyche which we've inherited, so their imagery, their fantasy, their dream, is our fantasy and our dream. That's what Jung demonstrates so magnificently in his major works on alchemy.

Jung maintained that:

The world of alchemical symbols does not belong to the rubbish heap of the past, but stands in a very real and living relationship to our most recent discoveries concerning the psychology of the unconscious.

The Journal of Analytical Psychology said of this book:

What Jung has to convey is so truly original and so far ranging in its implications that I suspect this book will be a real challenge even to those most psychologically sophisticated. What he here presents in rich and documented detail can perhaps best be described as an anatomy of the objective psyche.

=== Editions ===
- 1963. 2nd ed. London: Routledge. ISBN 978-0-415-09115-2.
- 1970. Princeton, New Jersey: Princeton University Press. ISBN 978-0-691-09766-4.

== Vol 15. Spirit in Man, Art, and Literature ==
Spirit in Man, Art, and Literature (sometimes styled as The Spirit of...) is volume 15 in The Collected Works, and contains nine essays, written between 1922 and 1941, on Paracelsus, Freud, Picasso, sinologist Richard Wilhelm, James Joyce's Ulysses, artistic creativity generally, and the source of artistic creativity in archetypal structures.

=== Editions ===
- 1966. Princeton, New Jersey: Princeton University Press. ISBN 978-0-691-09773-2.
- 1967. London: Routledge. ISBN 978-0-415-05168-2.

== Vol 16. Practice of Psychotherapy ==
Practice of Psychotherapy, volume 16 in The Collected Works, contains essays on aspects of analytical therapy, specifically the transference, abreaction, and dream analysis. There is also an additional essay, "The Realities of Practical Psychotherapy", which was found among Jung's posthumous papers.

The book brings together Jung's essays on general questions of analytic therapy and dream analysis. It also contains his parallel between the transference phenomena and alchemical processes. The transference is illustrated and interpreted with a set of symbolic pictures, and the bond between psychotherapist and patient is shown to be a function of the kinship libido. Rather than being pathological in its effects, kinship libido has a significant role to play in the work of individuation and in establishing an organic society based on the psychic connection of its members with one another and with their own roots.

=== Editions ===
- 1966. Princeton, New Jersey: Princeton University Press. ISBN 978-0-691-09767-1.
- 1993. London: Routledge. ISBN 978-0-415-10234-6.

== Vol 17. Development of Personality ==
Development of Personality, volume 17 in The Collected Works, contains papers on child psychology, education, and individuation. The book emphasizes the extreme importance of parents and teachers in the genesis of the intellectual, feeling, and emotional disorders of childhood. A final paper deals with marriage as an aid or obstacle to self-realization.

Jung repeatedly emphasizes the importance of the psychology of parents and teachers in a child's development. He underlines the fact that an unsatisfactory psychological relationship between parents may be an important cause of disorders in childhood. He maintained that the education of children needs teachers who not only know about learning but who can also develop their own personalities. A large part of this book is devoted to expounding Jung's views on these important subjects. There is also an outline of the theory of child development, a snapshot from the life of a girl called Anna and her parents, and a discussion of marriage as a psychological relationship. Finally there is a chapter on child development and individuation.

=== Editions ===
- 1954. Princeton, New Jersey: Princeton University Press. ISBN 978-0-691-09763-3.
- 1992. London: Routledge. ISBN 978-0-415-07174-1.

== Vol 18. The Symbolic Life ==
The Symbolic Life, volume 18 in The Collected Works, contains miscellaneous writings that Jung published after the Collected Works had been planned; minor and fugitive works that he wished to assign to a special volume, and early writings that came to light in the course of research.

Originally planned as a brief final volume in the Collected Works, The Symbolic Life has become the largest volume in the series, and one of unusual interest. It contains 160 items spanning sixty years; they include forewords, replies to questionnaires, encyclopedia articles, occasional addresses, and letters on technical subjects.

Collection of this material relied on three circumstances: First, after Jung returned from medical practice, he devoted more time to writing – after 1950 he wrote about sixty books and papers. Second, research uncovered reviews, reports and articles from the early years of his career. Finally, Jung's files yielded several finished or nearly finished papers that survived in manuscript.

Volume 18 includes three longer works: "The Tavistock Lectures" (1936); "Symbols and the Interpretation of Dreams" (1961); and "The Symbolic Life", the transcript of a 1939 seminar given in London.

=== Editions ===
- 1977. Princeton, New Jersey: Princeton University Press. ISBN 978-0-691-09892-0.
- 1977. London: Routledge. ISBN 978-0-415-09895-3.

== Vol 19. General Bibliography ==
Replacing the 1979 edition, this volume is a current record, through 1990, of all of Jung's publications in German and in English. It records the initial publication of each original work by Jung, each translation into English, and all significant new editions, including paperbacks and publications in periodicals. The contents of the respective volumes of the Collected Works of C. G. Jung and the Gesammelte Werke (published in Switzerland) are listed in parallel to show the interrelation of the two editions. Jung's seminars are dealt with in detail. Where possible, information is provided about the origin of works that were first conceived as lectures. There are indexes of all publications, personal names, organizations and societies, and periodicals.

== Vol 20. General Index ==
This volume is the general index to the eighteen published textual volumes in the Collected Works of C. G. Jung. The comprehensive indexing goes beyond the volume indexes, and includes sub-indexes to important general topics, such as Alchemical Collections; Codices and Manuscripts; Freud; and the sub-indexing for the Bible arranged by book, chapter and verse.

The General Index, with the General Bibliography of C. G. Jung's Writings (Volume 19 of the Collected Works), together complete the publication of the Collected Works of C. G. Jung in English.

== Philemon Series ==
The Philemon Series is currently in production by the Philemon Foundation. The series will eventually include an additional 30 volumes of work containing previously unpublished manuscripts, seminars and correspondence.

- The Jung-White Letters, 2007.
- Children's Dreams, 2008.
- The Red Book, 2009.
- Jung contra Freud: The 1912 New York Lectures on the Theory of Psychoanalysis, 2012.
- Introduction to Jungian Psychology: Notes of the Seminar on Analytical Psychology Given in 1925, 2012.
- The Question of Psychological Types, 2013.
- Dream Interpretation Ancient and Modern, 2014.
- The Jung & Neumann Correspondence, 2015.
- Notes from C. G. Jung's Lecture on Gérard de Nerval's "Aurélia", 2015.
- History of Modern Psychology: Lectures Delivered at the ETH Zurich, Volume 1: 1933–1934, 2018.
- Dream Symbols of the Individuation Process. Notes of C. G. Jung's Seminars on Wolfgang Pauli's Dreams, 2019.
- On Theology and Psychology: The Correspondence of C. G. Jung and Adolf Keller, 2020.
- The Black Books, 2020.
- Psychology of Yoga and Meditation: Lectures Delivered at ETH Zurich, Volume 6: 1938–1940, 2021.
- Consciousness and the Unconscious: Lectures Delivered at ETH Zurich, Volume 2: 1934, 2022.
- Jung on Ignatius of Loyola’s Spiritual Exercises: Lectures Delivered at ETH Zurich, Volume 7: 1939–1940, 2023.
- On Dreams and the East: Notes of the 1933 Berlin Seminar. C. G. Jung and Heinrich Zimmer, 2025.
- Jung’s Life and Work: Interviews for Memories, Dreams, Reflections with Aniela Jaffé, 2025.

== The Critical Edition of the Works of C. G. Jung ==
On March 8, 2024, Princeton University Press announced The Critical Edition of the Works of C. G. Jung. This multi-year publishing project will make new translations of C. G. Jung’s writing available in a 26-volume critical edition, organized chronologically and with a scholarly apparatus.

It is overseen by general editor Sonu Shamdasani, a historian of psychiatry and psychology and a leading Jung scholar, as well as editor emeritus and co-founder of the Philemon Foundation. Princeton once again approached Shamdasani with the Critical Edition project after he had come to believe that «the Philemon Foundation, which had been struggling to raise money to publish more of Jung’s unpublished works, wasn’t going to survive for much longer».

Princeton scheduled the publication of the first two volumes for February and November 2027, respectively. The list of titles is as follows:

- Carl Gustav Jung. Shamdasani, Sonu (ed.). The Critical Edition of the Works of C. G. Jung. Twenty-six volumes in hardcover and electronic format, translated by Caitlin Stephens and Astrid Freuler. Princeton University Press & Stiftung der Werke von C. G. Jung.
1. Volume 1: Student Years in Basel: Philosophy, Medicine, Science, and Spiritualism, 1896–1900. Editor Gaia Domenici, translator Caitlin Stephens. February 23, 2027. ISBN 9780691269306.
2. Volume 2: Psychiatry and Psychical Research: Jung at the Burghölzli Asylum, 1901–1904. Editor Sonu Shamdasani, translator Caitlin Stephens. November 9, 2027. ISBN 9780691269382.
3. Volume 3: Experimental Psychopathology: Jung at the Burghölzli Asylum, 1904–1905. Editor Martin Liebscher.
4. Volume 4: Complexes, Psychoanalysis and the Psychology of Psychosis: Jung at the Burghölzli Asylum, 1906–1907. Editor Martin Liebscher.
5. Volume 5: The Founding of the International Psychoanalytic Movement, 1908–1911. Editor Sonu Shamdasani.
6. Volume 6: Transformations and Symbols of the Libido: Contributions to the Origins and History of Thought, 1912. Editor Christopher Wagner.
7. Volume 7: From Psychoanalysis to Analytical Psychology, 1912–1914. Editor Christopher Wagner.
8. Volume 8: Discovering the Soul and the Founding of Analytical Psychology, 1914–1922. Editor Sonu Shamdasani.
9. Volume 9: Psychological Types, 1921. Editor Gaia Domenici.
10. Volume 10: Structures of Unconscious Processes, 1922–1927. Editor Martin Liebscher.
11. Volume 11: Psychotherapy and the Modern World, 1928–1930. Editor Christopher Wagner.
12. Volume 12: Contemporary Problems of the Soul, 1930–1934. Editor Gaia Domenici.
13. Volume 13: The Soul in Death and Life: Fundamentals of Psychology and Psychotherapy, 1934–1935. Editor Gaia Domenici.
14. Volume 14: Comparative Studies of the Individuation Process, 1936–1937. Editor Sonu Shamdasani.
15. Volume 15: Psychology of Religion and Alchemy, 1937–1938. Editor Martin Liebscher.
16. Volume 16: Archetypes, Mythology, and Religion, 1939–1942. Editor Sonu Shamdasani.
17. Volume 17: Psychology and Alchemy, 1944. Editor Christopher Wagner.
18. Volume 18: Christian Symbols, Eastern Meditations, and Depth Psychology, 1942–1945. Editor Martin Liebscher.
19. Volume 19: Shadows and Chaos: Alchemy and Psychotherapy, 1945–1946. Editor Gaia Domenici.
20. Volume 20: Psychology and Spirit, 1946–1950. Editor Sonu Shamdasani.
21. Volume 21: Aion: Contributions to the Symbolism of the Self, 1951. Editor Christopher Wagner.
22. Volume 22: Symbols of Transformation: Analysis of the Prelude to a Case of Schizophrenia, 1952. Editor Christopher Wagner.
23. Volume 23: Answer to Job, Synchronicity, and Mandala Symbolism, 1950–1953. Editor Martin Liebscher.
24. Volume 24: Mysterium Coniunctionis: Researches on the Separation and Joining of Psychic Opposites in Alchemy, 1955–1956. Editor Christopher Wagner.
25. Volume 25: Self-Knowledge and the Collective Unconscious in a Fragmented World, 1954–1958. Editor Martin Liebscher.
26. Volume 26: Contemporary Myths: Symbols and the Interpretation of Dreams, 1958–1961. Editor Gaia Domenici.

== Reception ==
Philosopher Walter Kaufmann has criticized the arrangement of the Collected Works as unsystematic, and R. F. C. Hull's translation as occasionally inaccurate.

== See also ==
- Carl Jung
- Carl Jung publications
