= R. F. C. Hull =

British translator

Richard Francis Carrington Hull (5 March 1913 – 16 December 1974), was a British translator, best known for his role in translating The Collected Works of C. G. Jung. He also translated many other scholarly works.

He was born in Eastbourne, Sussex, to Irma Carrington and Francis Reginald Hull. His uncle, Irma's brother, was the psychic researcher Hereward Carrington. Hull began his education in medicine, but withdrew from that in favor of journalism and poetry. During the 1930s, he began translating the works of Rilke, and during World War II, he was a cryptographer in the U.K.'s secret Ultra project. After the war, he began to translate professionally for Kegan Paul and others, specializing in works on philosophy. Hull was described as quick-minded, a stutterer and a "tall, elegant, distinguished-looking man sporting a malacca cane with a silver top."

Most of the English-speaking world know of Carl Jung's work through translations by R.F.C. Hull. He translated or recycled about four million words of Jung's writings, and his obituary said that "Virtually every word that Jung wrote or that was recorded as his statement passed through the circuit of Hull's mind."

Hull also made numerous English-language verse translations of the comic poems of Christian Morgenstern.
