= Carl Jung =

Swiss psychiatrist and psychotherapist (1875–1961)

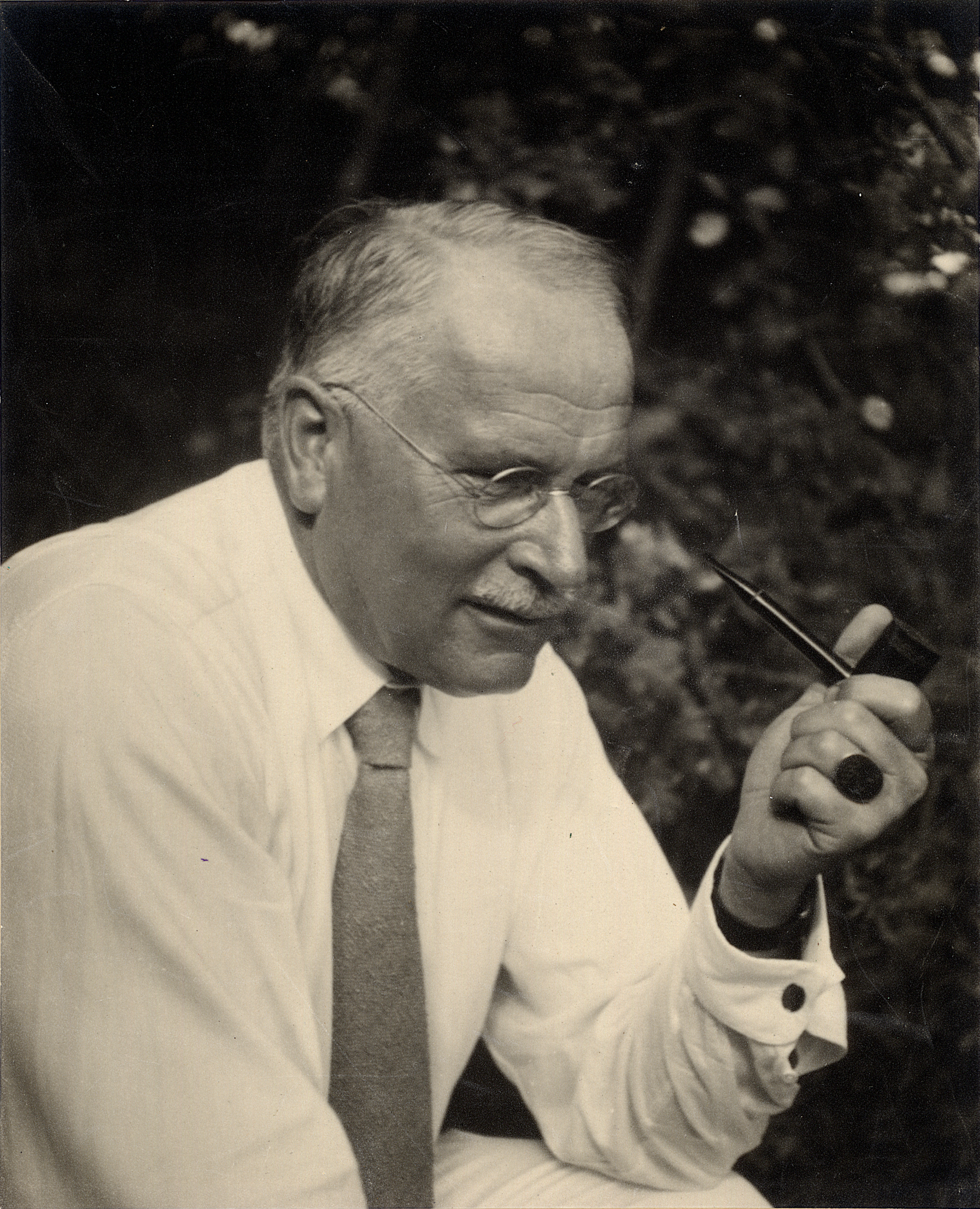
- Jung, c. 1935
- Born: Karl Gustav Jung; 26 July 1875; Kesswil, Thurgau, Switzerland
- Died: 6 June 1961 (aged 85); Küsnacht, Zurich, Switzerland
- Education: University of Basel; University of Zurich
- Known for: Analytical psychology; Psychological Types; Collective unconscious; Complex; Archetypes; Anima and animus; Enantiodromia; Synchronicity; Shadow; Extraversion and introversion
- Spouse: Emma Rauschenbach (m. 1903; died 1955)
- Children: 5
- Relatives: Karl Gustav Jung (grandfather)
- Scientific career
- Fields: Psychiatry; psychology
- Workplaces: Burghölzli
- Doctoral advisor: Eugen Bleuler

Carl Gustav Jung (/jʊŋ/ YUUNG; Swiss Standard German: [ˈkarl ˈjʊŋ]; 26 July 1875 – 6 June 1961) was a Swiss psychiatrist, psychotherapist, and psychologist who founded the school of analytical psychology. (Note: Jung's identification as a "psychoanalyst" was temporary (Quote: "Between the years 1907 and 1912, when Jung was a psycho-analyst"). Following Freud's exclusive definition of the term, Jung stopped referring to his practice as "psycho-analysis". He resigned as president of the International Psychoanalytical Association and later was characterized as an "analytical psychologist".) He was a prolific author of over twenty books, illustrator, correspondent, and academic, best known for his concept of archetypes. Widely considered one of the most influential psychologists of all time, Jung's work has fostered not only scholarship, but also popular interest. His work has been influential in the fields of psychiatry, anthropology, archaeology, literature, philosophy, psychology, and religious studies.

Jung worked as a research scientist at the Burghölzli psychiatric hospital in Zurich, under Eugen Bleuler. He established himself as an influential mind, developing a friendship with Sigmund Freud, the founder of psychoanalysis, and conducting a lengthy correspondence regarding their joint vision of human psychology. Freud saw the younger Jung not only as the heir he had been seeking to take forward his "new science" of psychoanalysis, but as a means to legitimise his own work: Freud and other contemporary psychoanalysts were Jews facing rising antisemitism in Europe, while Jung was raised as Christian, although he did not strictly adhere to traditional Christian doctrine, seeing religion, including Christianity, as a powerful expression of the human psyche and its search for meaning. Freud secured Jung's appointment as president of Freud's newly founded International Psychoanalytical Association. Jung's research and personal vision, however, made it difficult to follow his older colleague's doctrine, and they parted ways. This division was painful for Jung and resulted in the establishment of Jung's analytical psychology as a comprehensive system separate from psychoanalysis.

Among the central concepts of analytical psychology is individuation—the lifelong psychological process of differentiation of the self out of each individual's conscious and unconscious elements. Jung considered it to be the main task of human development. He created some of the best-known psychological concepts, including synchronicity, archetypal phenomena, the collective unconscious, the psychological complex, and extraversion and introversion. His treatment of American businessman and politician Rowland Hazard in 1926 with his conviction that alcoholics may recover if they have a "vital spiritual (or religious) experience" played a crucial role in the chain of events that led to the formation of Alcoholics Anonymous. Jung was an artist, craftsman, builder, and prolific writer. Many of his works were not published until after his death, and some remain unpublished.

== Biography ==
=== Early life ===
==== Childhood ====
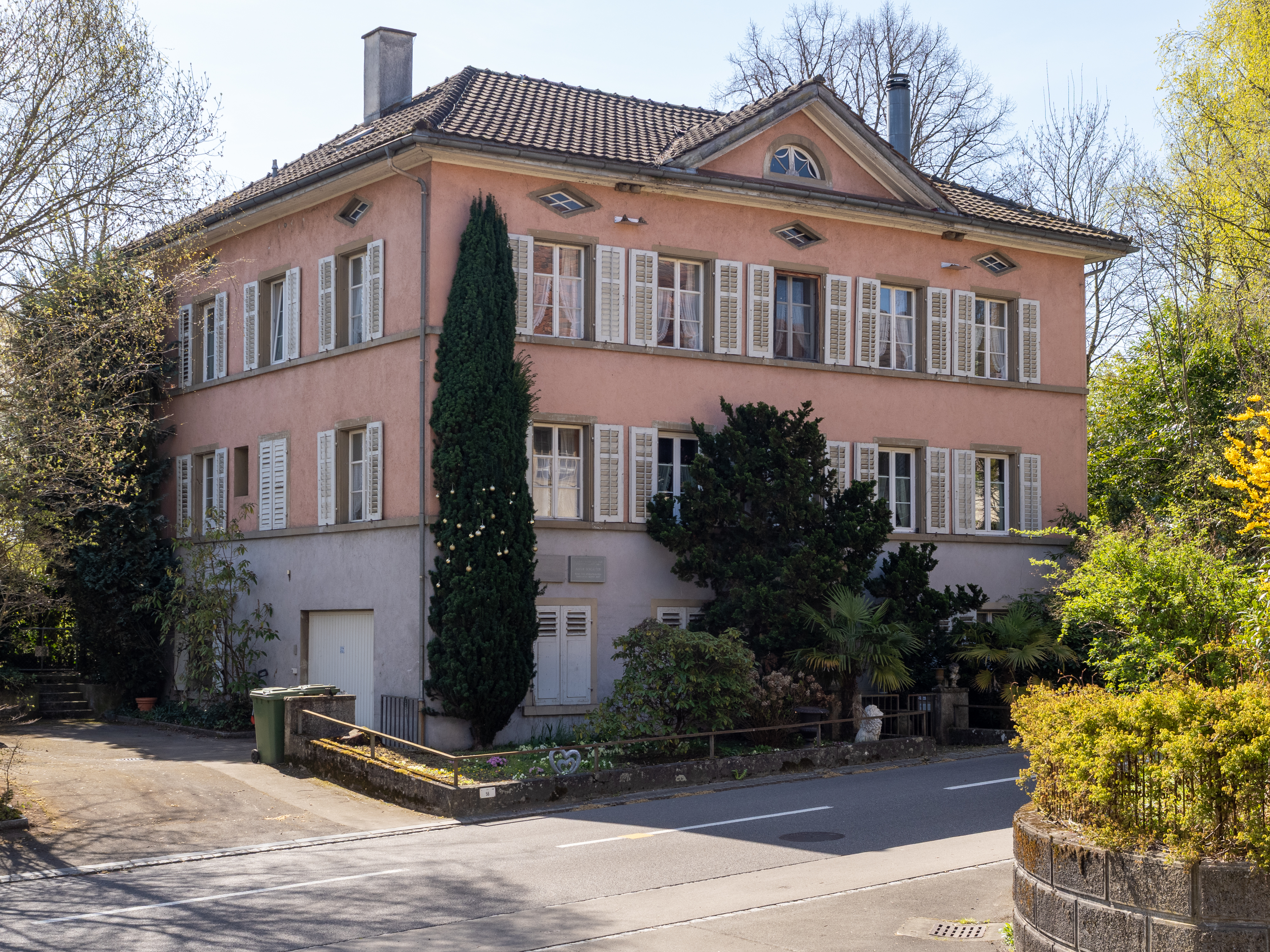
Birthplace in Kesswil

Carl Gustav Jung (Note: As a university student, Jung changed the modernized spelling of Karl to the original family form of Carl. Bair, Deirdre (2003). Jung: A Biography. New York: Back Bay Books. pp. 7, 53. ISBN 978-0-316-15938-8.) was born 26 July 1875 in Kesswil, in the Swiss canton of Thurgau, as the first surviving son of Paul Achilles Jung (1842–1896) and Emilie Jung (née Preiswerk; 1848–1923). His birth was preceded by two stillbirths and that of a son named Paul, born in 1873, who survived only a few days.

Paul Jung, Carl's father, was the youngest son of a noted German-Swiss physician and professor of medicine at Basel, Karl Gustav Jung (1794–1864). Karl Jung became Rector of Basel University and Master of the Swiss Lodge of Freemasons. It was rumoured that he was the illegitimate son of Goethe, but this is likely a legend. Paul Jung was a rural pastor in the Swiss Reformed Church.Jung considered his father reliable, but weak and powerless.

Emilie Preiswerk, Carl's mother, grew up in a large family whose Swiss roots went back five centuries. She was the youngest child of a distinguished Basel churchman and academic, Samuel Preiswerk (1799–1871), and his second wife. Samuel Preiswerk was an Antistes (the title given to the head of the Reformed clergy in the city) as well as a Hebraist, author, and editor, who taught Paul Jung as his professor of Hebrew at Basel University. He was an early advocate of Zionism and was interested in the occult.

Eight of Carl Jung's uncles were also clergymen.

In contrast to his father, Carl saw his mother as unreliable and inconsistent, which caused him to associate women more broadly as having an "innate unreliability" (Later, these early impressions were revised: "I have trusted men friends and been disappointed by them, and I have mistrusted women and was not disappointed."). Emilie was an eccentric and depressed woman; she spent considerable time in her bedroom, where she said spirits visited her at night. Though she was normal during the day, Jung recalled that at night, his mother became strange and mysterious. He said that one night, he saw a faintly luminous and indefinite figure coming from her room, with a head detached from the neck and floating in the air in front of the body. Jung had a better relationship with his father.

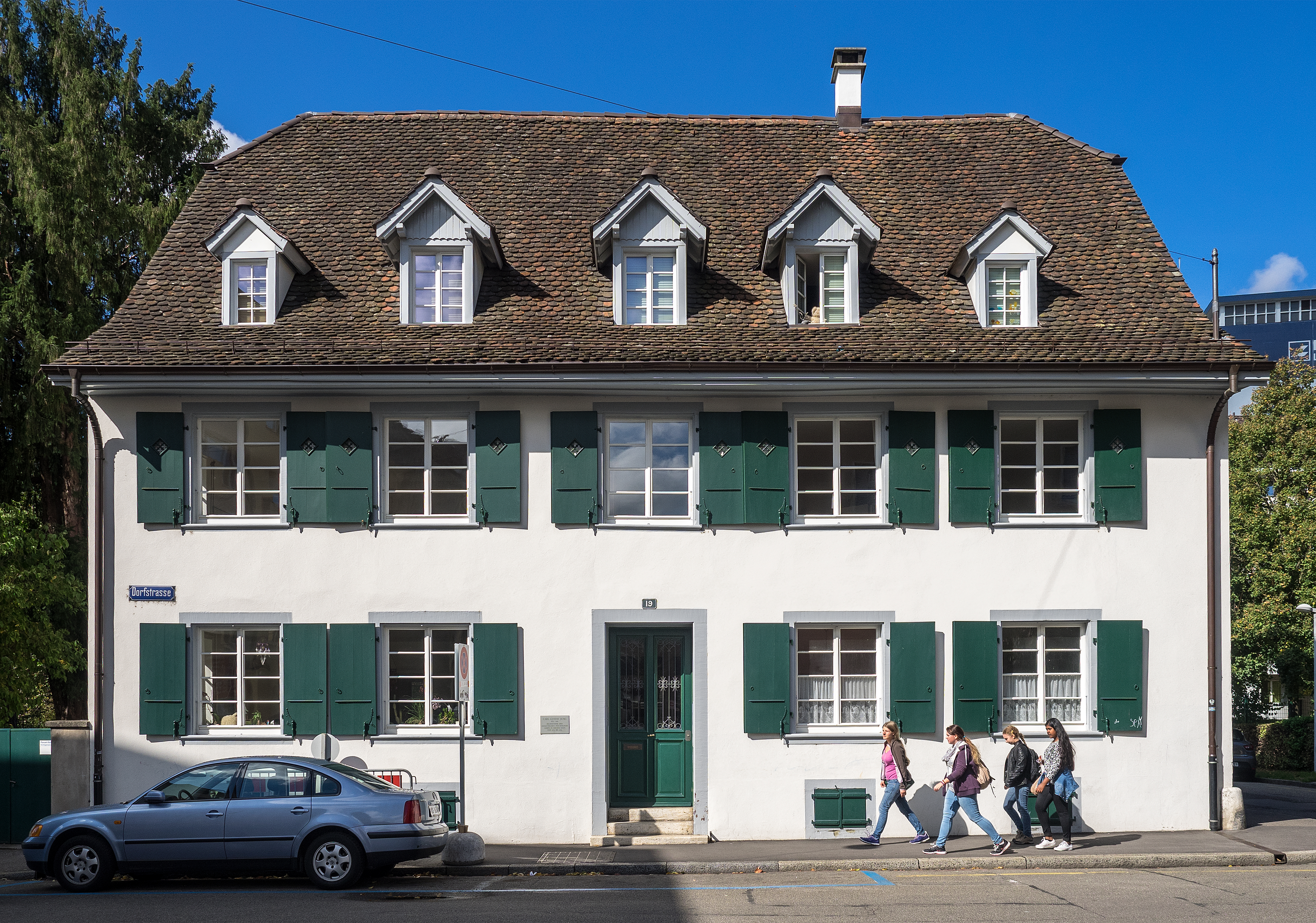
The clergy house in Kleinhüningen, Basel, where Jung grew up

Jung's father was appointed to a more prosperous parish in Laufen when Carl was six months old. Whilst there, tensions between Jung's father and mother had developed. When Jung was three years old, his mother left Laufen for several months of hospitalisation near Basel for some unspecified physical ailment, which he later attributed to problems in their marriage. His father took Carl to be cared for by Emilie Jung's unmarried sister in Basel, but he was later brought back to his father's residence. Carl developed generalised eczema in response. In his memoir, Jung would remark that this parental influence was the "handicap I started off with".

After three years living in Laufen, Paul Jung requested a transfer. In 1879, he was called to Klein-Hüningen, next to Basel, where his family lived in a church parsonage. The relocation brought Emilie closer to contact with her family and lifted her melancholy.

When Jung was nine, his sister Johanna Gertrud (1884–1935) was born. Known in the family as "Trudi", she later became a secretary to her brother.

Jung attended a local village school, and at 10 (or 11) went to Basel Gymnasium, where he was very unhappy. Between ages 17 and 18, Jung became interested in philosophy, in particular in Pythagoras, Heraclitus (a life-long favourite), Empedocles, Plato, Schopenhauer through his The World as Will and Idea, and Kant's Critique of Pure Reason. He also discovered Goethe through Faust and Meister Eckhart, who became life-long favourites.

==== Memories of childhood ====
Jung was a solitary and introverted child. From childhood, he believed that, like his mother, he had two personalities—a modern Swiss citizen and a personality more suited to the 18th century. "Personality Number 1", as he termed it, was a typical schoolboy living in the era of the time, his conscious personality. "Personality Number 2" was a dignified, authoritative, and influential man from the past, his unconscious. Though Jung was close to both parents, he was disappointed by his father's academic approach to faith. (Note: Wehr records that Paul's chosen career path was to achieve a doctorate in philology. He was an Arabist, but the family money ran out for his studies. Relief came from a family legacy; however, a condition of the will was that it should only be offered to a family member who intended to study theology and become a pastor. Paul Jung, therefore, had his career determined by a will, not his will. See p.20.)

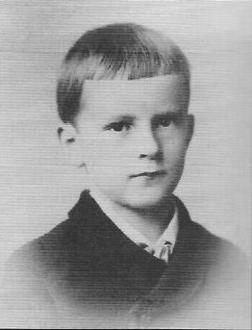
Jung as a child, early 1880s

Some childhood memories made lifelong impressions on him. As a boy, he carved a tiny mannequin into the end of the wooden ruler from his pencil case and placed it inside it. He added a stone, which he had painted into the upper and lower halves, and hid the case in the attic. Periodically, he would return to the mannequin, often bringing tiny sheets of paper with messages inscribed on them in his own secret language. He later reflected that this ceremonial act brought him a feeling of inner peace and security. Years later, he discovered similarities between his personal experience and the practices associated with totems in Indigenous cultures, such as the collection of soul-stones near Arlesheim or the tjurungas of Australia. He concluded that his intuitive ceremonial act was an unconscious ritual, which he had practiced in a way that was strikingly similar to those in distant locations which he, as a young boy, knew nothing about. His observations about symbols, archetypes, and the collective unconscious were inspired, in part, by these early experiences combined with his later research.

At the age of 12, shortly before the end of his first year at the Humanistisches Gymnasium in Basel, Jung was pushed to the ground by another boy and hit his head, momentarily losing consciousness (he later recognised the incident was indirectly his fault). A thought then came to him—"Now you won't have to go to school anymore". From then on, whenever he walked to school or began homework, he fainted. He remained home for six months until he overheard his father speaking hurriedly to a visitor about the boy's future ability to support himself. They suspected he had epilepsy. Confronted with his family's poverty, he realized the need for academic excellence. He entered his father's study and began poring over Latin grammar. He fainted three more times but eventually overcame the urge and did not faint again. This event, Jung later recalled, "was when I learned what a neurosis is".

==== University studies and early career ====
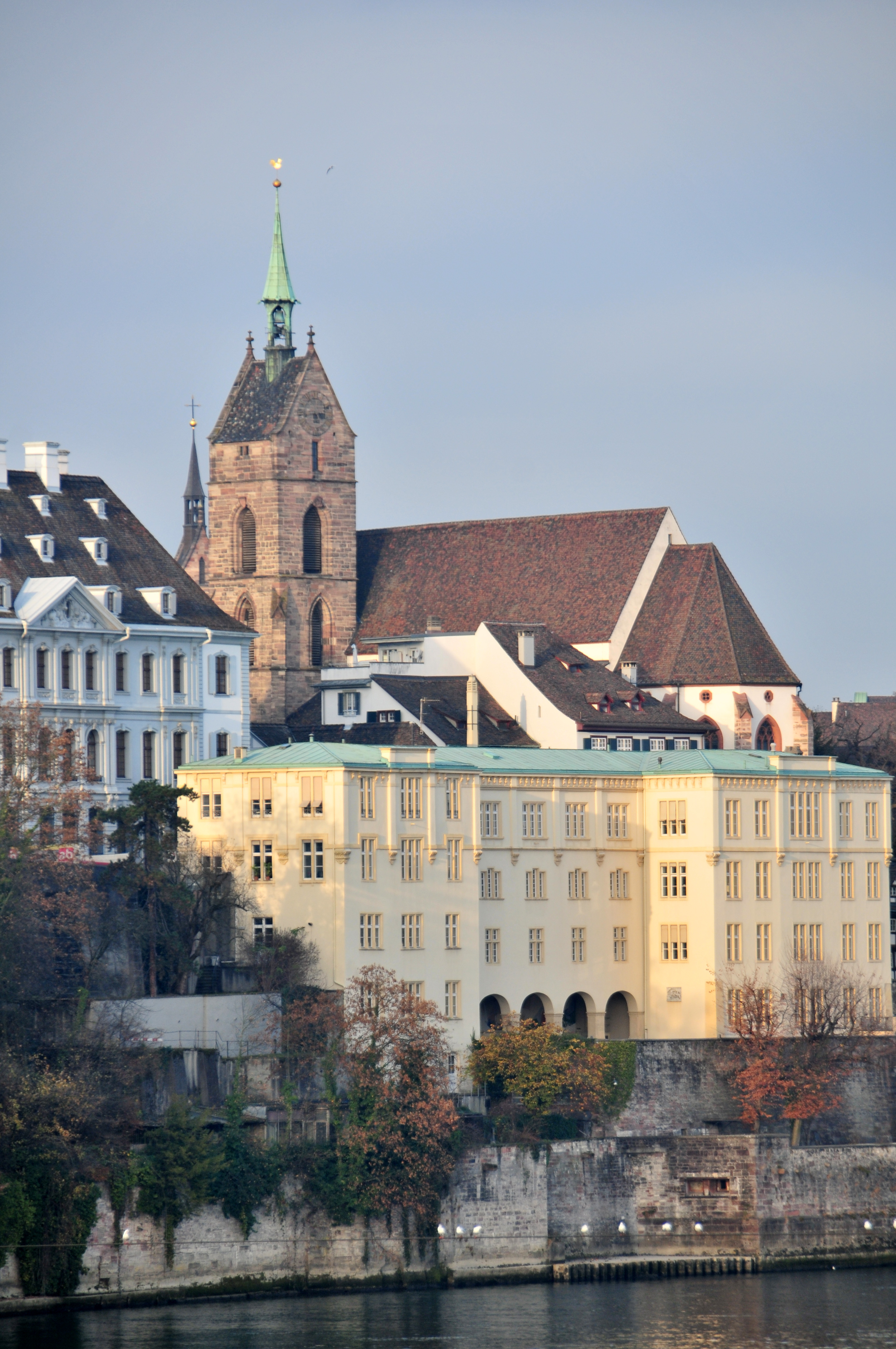
Old main building of the University of Basel (foreground), where Jung studied between 1895 and 1900

Initially, Jung aspired to be a Christian minister. His household had a strong moral sense, and several of his family were clergy. Jung had wanted to study archaeology, but his family could not afford to send him further than the University of Basel, which did not teach it. After studying philosophy in his teens, Jung rejected the path of religious traditionalism and decided to pursue psychiatry and medicine. His interest was captured by the fields' combination of the biological and spiritual, exactly what he was searching for.

In 1895, Jung began to study medicine at the University of Basel on a grant. Barely a year later, his father, Paul, died and left the family nearly destitute. The family was helped by relatives, who also contributed to Jung's studies.

During his student days, Jung entertained his contemporaries with the family legend that his paternal grandfather was the illegitimate son of Goethe and his German great-grandmother, Sophie Ziegler. In later life, he pulled back from this tale, saying only that Sophie was a friend of Goethe's niece.

Influenced by an earlier study by Freud's contemporary Théodore Flournoy, Jung wrote his doctoral thesis on spiritualism, focusing on a young medium, his cousin Hélène Preiswerk, whose séances and table turnings he had attended. Titled On the Psychology and Pathology of So-Called Occult Phenomena, it was published in 1903.

It was during this early period when Jung was an assistant at the Anatomical Institute at Basel University, that he took an interest in paleoanthropology and the revolutionary discoveries of Homo erectus and Neanderthal fossils. These formative experiences contributed to his fascination with the evolutionary past of humanity and his belief that an ancient evolutionary layer in the psyche, represented by early fossil hominins, is still evident in the psychology of modern humans.

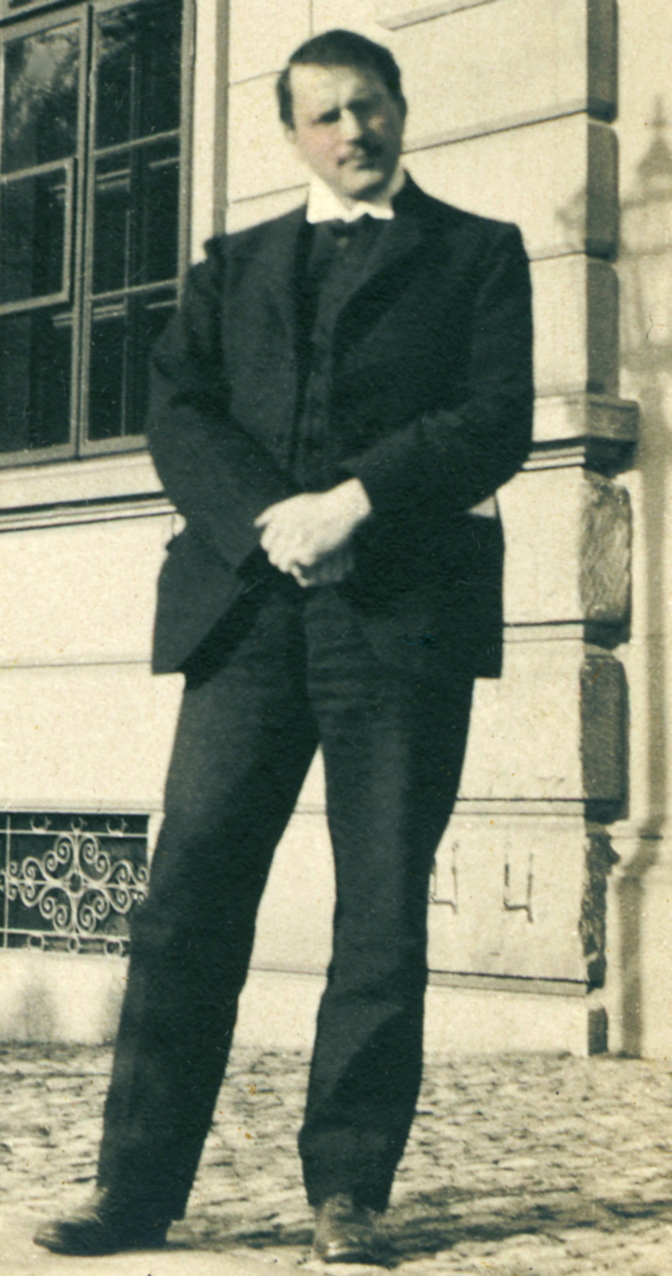
Jung outside Burghölzli in 1910

Despite showing promise in medicine and almost choosing to specialise in surgery, Jung, to the dismay of his family and professors, decided to become a psychiatrist after reading a Richard von Krafft-Ebing's Textbook of Psychiatry. In December 1900, he moved to Zürich and began as an intern (voluntary doctor) at the Burghölzli psychiatric hospital under the psychiatrist Eugen Bleuler. Bleuler was already in communication with Sigmund Freud and introduced Jung to his work. At Burghölzli, Jung became interested in 'dementia praecox' (former name for schizophrenia, a term that Bleuler came up with). Before this he had mainly been interested in neurosis, but psychotic patients would become his primary concern for the rest of his career.

In 1902, on leave from Burghölzli, Jung studied with Pierre Janet in Paris, and later equated his view of the complex with Janet's idée fixe subconsciente. In 1905, Jung was appointed as a permanent 'senior' doctor at Burghölzli and became a lecturer Privatdozent in the medical faculty of Zurich University. In 1904, with Franz Riklin, he published Diagnostic Association Studies, of which Freud obtained a copy. In 1909, Jung left Burghölzli and began a private practice in his home in Küsnacht.

=== Marriage ===
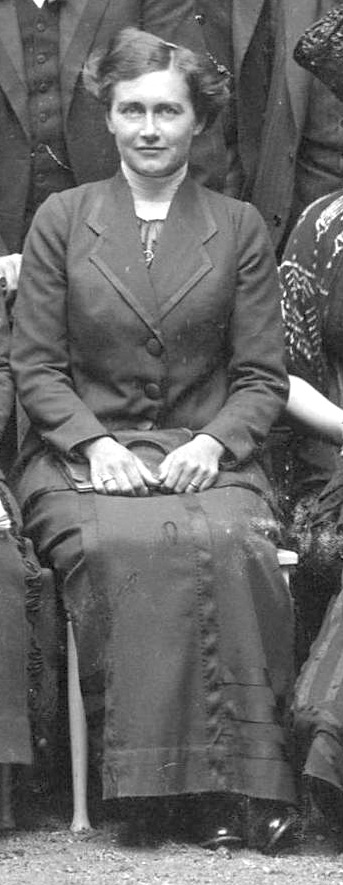
Emma Jung in 1911. She assisted her husband in his early research before becoming a psychoanalyst and author.

In 1903, Jung married Emma Rauschenbach (1882–1955), seven years his junior and the elder daughter of a wealthy industrialist in eastern Switzerland, Johannes Rauschenbach-Schenck. Johannes was the owner of IWC Schaffhausen—the International Watch Company, manufacturer of luxury time-pieces. Upon his death in 1905, his two daughters and their husbands became owners of the business. Jung's brother-in-law—Ernst Homberger—became the principal proprietor, but the Jungs remained shareholders in a thriving business that ensured the family's financial security for decades.

Emma Jung, whose education had been limited, showed considerable ability and interest in her husband's research. She threw herself into psychological studies and acted as his assistant at Burghölzli. She eventually became a noted psychoanalyst in her own right and lectured at the Jungian Institute in Zürich.

Carl and Emma Jung first lived together in a flat at Burghölzli, and then, in 1908, they moved to a house that they designed and built beside the lake at Küstnacht, where they lived for the rest of their lives. The marriage lasted until Emma died in 1955. They had five children:

- Agathe Niehus, born on 28 December 1904
- Gret Baumann, born on 8 February 1906
- Franz Jung-Merker, born on 28 November 1908
- Marianne Niehus, born on 20 September 1910
- Helene Hoerni, born on 18 March 1914

None of the children continued in their father's field. The daughters, Agathe and Marianne, assisted in publishing work.

During his marriage, Jung engaged in at least one extramarital relationship: with his patient and, later, fellow psychoanalyst Sabina Spielrein. A continuing affair with Toni Wolff, starting in 1910, has also been alleged. Jung confided in Freud that he had "'polygamous components' in himself" and that "'The pre-requisite of a good marriage, it seems to me, is the licence to be unfaithful'".

=== Relationship with Freud ===
==== Meeting and collaboration ====
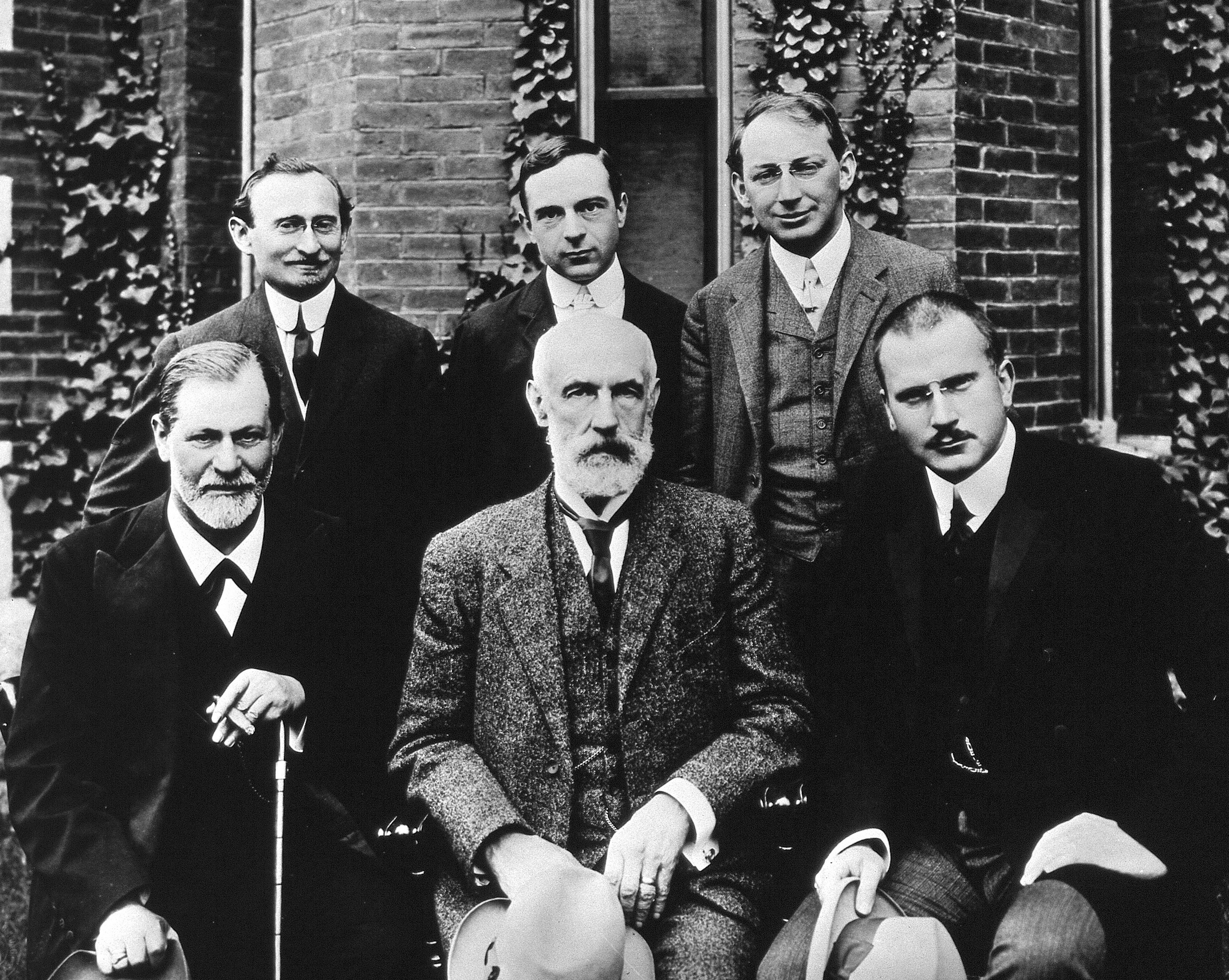
Group photo 1909 in front of Clark University. Front row, Sigmund Freud, G. Stanley Hall, Carl Jung. Back row, Abraham Brill, Ernest Jones, Sándor Ferenczi.

Jung was introduced to Freud's work by Bleuler whilst working at Burghölzli Hospital. Bleuler asked him to write a review of The Interpretation of Dreams (1899), which he read in 1900. In the early 1900s, psychology as a science was still in its early stages, but Jung became a qualified practitioner of Freud's new "psycho-analysis". Freud needed collaborators and pupils to validate and spread his ideas. Burghölzli was a renowned psychiatric clinic in Zurich, and Jung's research had already gained him international recognition. Jung sent Freud a copy of his Studies in Word Association in 1906. The same year, he published Diagnostic Association Studies, a copy of which he later sent to Freud, who had already purchased a copy.

Preceded by a lively correspondence, Jung met Freud for the first time in Vienna on 3 March 1907.Jung recalled the discussion between himself and Freud as interminable and unceasing for 13 hours. Six months later, the then 50-year-old Freud sent a collection of his latest published essays to Jung in Zurich. This began an intense correspondence and collaboration that lasted six years. In 1908, Jung became an editor of the newly founded Yearbook for Psychoanalytical and Psychopathological Research.

In the late summer of 1909, Jung sailed with Freud and Hungarian psychoanalyst Sándor Ferenczi to the United States. From 7–11 September, they took part in the twentieth-anniversary celebration of the founding of Clark University in Worcester, Massachusetts, the Vicennial Conference on Psychology and Pedagogy. Freud was the featured lecturer, and Jung spoke and received an honorary degree. The conference was planned by the psychologist G. Stanley Hall and included 27 distinguished psychiatrists, neurologists, and psychologists. It represented a watershed in the acceptance of psychoanalysis in North America. This forged welcome links between Jung and influential Americans. Jung returned to the United States the next year for a brief visit.

In 1910, Freud proposed Jung, "his adopted eldest son, his crown prince, and successor," for the position of lifetime President of the newly formed International Psychoanalytical Association. However, after forceful objections from his Viennese colleagues, it was agreed Jung would be elected to serve a two-year term of office.

==== Divergence and break ====
While Jung worked on his Psychology of the Unconscious: a study of the transformations and symbolisms of the libido, tensions manifested between him and Freud because of various disagreements, including those concerning the nature of libido. Jung de-emphasized the importance of sexual development and focused on the collective unconscious: the part of the unconscious that contains memories and ideas that Jung believed were inherited from ancestors. While he did think that the libido was an important source of personal growth, unlike Freud, Jung did not think that the libido alone was responsible for the formation of the core personality.

In 1912, these tensions came to a peak because Jung felt severely slighted after Freud visited his colleague Ludwig Binswanger in Kreuzlingen without paying him a visit in nearby Zurich, an incident Jung referred to as "the Kreuzlingen gesture". Shortly thereafter, Jung again traveled to the US and gave the Fordham University lectures, a six-week series, which were published later in the year as Psychology of the Unconscious, and subsequently republished as Symbols of Transformation. While they contain remarks on Jung's dissenting view on the libido, they represent largely a "psychoanalytical Jung" and not the theory of analytical psychology, for which he became famous in the following decades. Nonetheless, it was their publication which, Jung declared, "cost me my friendship with Freud".

Another disagreement with Freud stemmed from their differing concepts of the unconscious. Jung saw Freud's theory of the unconscious as incomplete, unnecessarily negative, and inelastic. According to Jung, Freud conceived the unconscious solely as a repository of repressed emotions and desires. Jung's observations overlap to an extent with Freud's model of the unconscious, what Jung called the "personal unconscious", but his hypothesis is more about a process than a static model, and he also proposed the existence of a second, overarching form of the unconscious beyond the personal, that he named the psychoid—a term borrowed from neo-vitalist philosopher and embryologist Hans Driesch (1867–1941)—but with a somewhat altered meaning. The collective unconscious is not so much a 'geographical location', but a deduction from the alleged ubiquity of archetypes over space and time.

Consequently, their personal and professional relationship fractured—each stating the other could not admit he could be wrong.

In November 1912, Jung and Freud met in Munich for a meeting among prominent colleagues to discuss psychoanalytical journals. At a talk about a new psychoanalytic essay on Amenhotep IV, Jung expressed his views on how it related to actual conflicts in the psychoanalytic movement. While Jung spoke, Freud suddenly fainted, and Jung carried him to a couch.

In early January 1913, Freud wrote to Jung, proposing that "we abandon our private relationship entirely. I will lose nothing, because I have long been joined to you only by the thin thread of the further development of past disappointments". Jung agreed to comply with this arrangement. They met personally for the last time in September 1913 at the Fourth International Psychoanalytical Congress in Munich. Jung gave a talk on psychological types, the introvert and extraverted types, in analytical psychology.

It was the publication of Jung's book The Psychology of the Unconscious in 1912 that led to the final break with Freud. The letters they exchanged at the time show Freud's refusal to consider Jung's ideas. This rejection caused what Jung described in his posthumously published autobiography, Memories, Dreams, Reflections (1962) as a "resounding censure". However, the exact reasons for this final break between the two is debated between Jungians and Freudians to this day.

After the culminating break in 1913, Jung went through a period of psychological strain and transformation. Henri Ellenberger called Jung's intense experience a "creative illness" and compared it favourably to Freud's own period of what he called neurasthenia and hysteria.

=== Interest in William James ===
During his first trip to the United States with Freud, Jung was introduced to the elder philosopher and psychologist William James, known as the "Father of American psychology," whose ideas Jung would incorporate into his own work. Jung connected with James around their mutual interests in mysticism, spiritualism and psychical phenomena. James wrote to a friend after the conference stating Jung "left a favorable impression," while "his views of Freud were mixed." James died about eleven months later.

The ideas of both Jung and James, on topics including hopelessness, self-surrender, and spiritual experiences, were influential in the development and founding of the international altruistic, spiritual movement Alcoholics Anonymous on 10 June 1935, in Akron, Ohio, a quarter of a century after James' death and in Jung's sixtieth year.

=== Midlife isolation ===
After the break between Jung and Freud in 1913, Jung went through a pivotal psychological transformation, and, after the Munich congress, he was on the verge of a psychosis.This was exacerbated by the outbreak of the First World War in August 1914. Jung described the experience as a horrible "confrontation with the unconscious". He saw visions and heard voices. He worried at times that he was "menaced by a psychosis" or was "doing a schizophrenia". These experiences precipitated his writing of his Red Book, his seven-volume personal diaries that were only published partially and posthumously in 2009.

In his crisis, Jung gave up his lectureship at the University of Zürich, although he continued his private practice in Küstnacht until his death in 1961.

Jung spoke at meetings of the Psycho-Medical Society in London in 1913 and 1914. His travels were soon interrupted by the war, but his ideas continued to receive attention in England primarily through the efforts of Constance Long, who translated and published the first English volume of his collected writings.

As well as his eventual break from Freud, Jung's publication of Psychology of the Unconscious in 1913 resulted in many of Jung's friends and colleagues dropping away and declaring him a mystic. This book was Jung's first publication, which represented his individual point of view and declared the difference between psychoanalysis and analytic psychology.

==== The Black Books and The Red Book ====
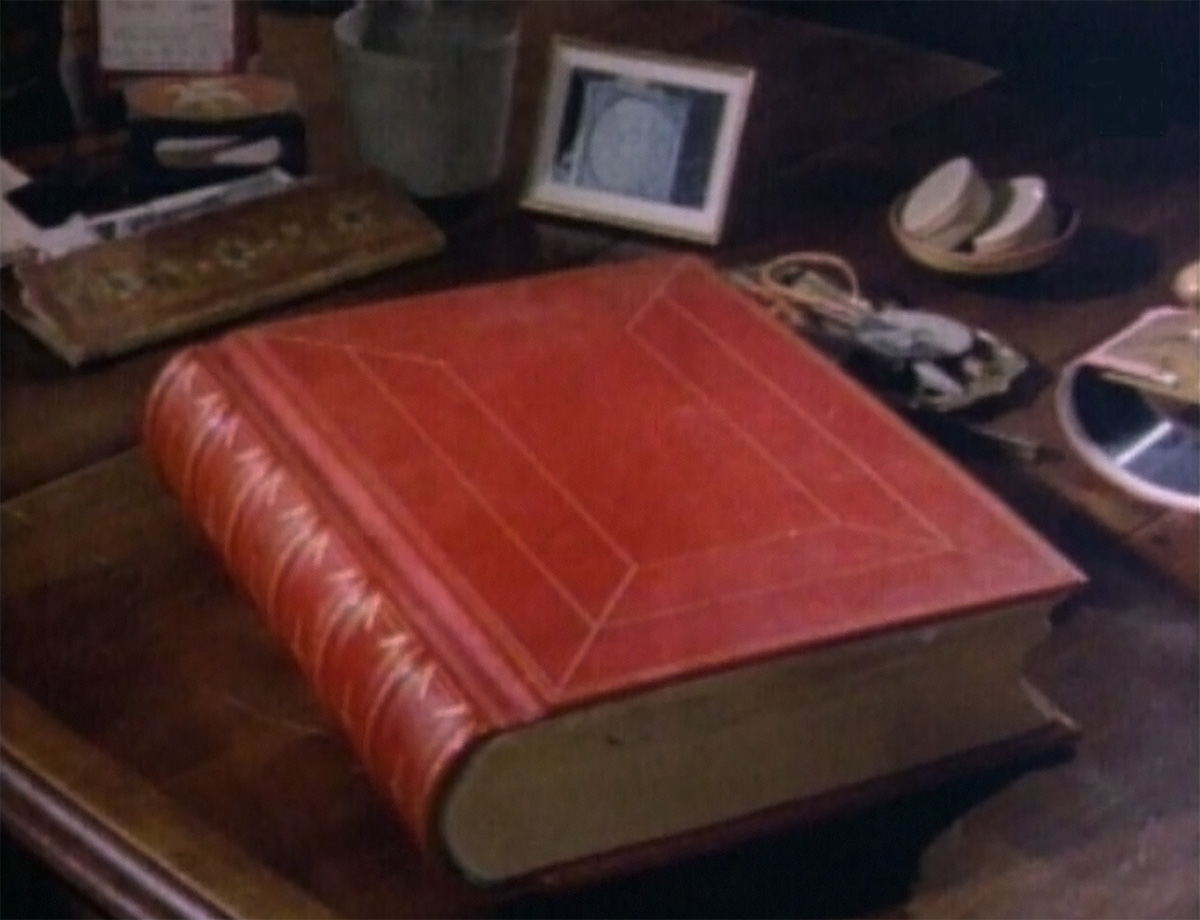
The Red Book resting on Jung's desk

Jung decided that his near-psychotic experiences were of value and, in private, he induced hallucinations or, in his words, a process of "active imagination". He recorded everything he experienced in small journals, which Jung referred to in the singular as his Black Book, considering it a "single integral whole", even though some of these original journals have a brown cover. Jung described his 1912 book as "an attempt, only partially successful, to create a wider setting for medical psychology and to bring the whole of the psychic phenomena within its purview". The book was later revised and retitled Symbols of Transformation in 1952. The material Jung wrote was subjected to several edits, hand-written and typed, including another, "second layer" of text, his continual psychological interpretations during the process of editing. Around 1915, Jung commissioned a large red leather-bound book, and began to transcribe his notes and paint, working intermittently for sixteen years.

Jung left no posthumous instructions about the final disposition of what he called the Liber Novus or Red Book. Sonu Shamdasani, a historian of psychology from London, tried for three years to persuade Jung's resistant heirs to have it published. Ulrich Hoerni, Jung's grandson who manages the Jung archives, decided to publish it when the necessary additional funds were raised through the Philemon Foundation. Up to September 2008, fewer than about two dozen people had ever seen it.

In 2007, two technicians for DigitalFusion, working with New York City publishers W. W. Norton & Company, scanned the manuscript with a 10,200-pixel scanner. It was published on 7 October 2009 in German, with a "separate English translation along with Shamdasani's introduction and footnotes" at the back of the book. According to Sara Corbett, reviewing the text for The New York Times, "The book is bombastic, baroque and like so much else about Carl Jung, a willful oddity, synced with an antediluvian and mystical reality."

The Rubin Museum of Art in New York City displayed Jung's Red Book leather folio, as well as some of his original "Black Book" journals, from 7 October 2009 to 15 February 2010. According to them, "During the period in which he worked on this book, Jung developed his principal theories of archetypes, collective unconscious, and the process of individuation." Two-thirds of the pages bear Jung's illuminations and illustrations to the text.

=== Wartime army service ===
During World War I, Jung was drafted as an army doctor, and soon made commandant of an internment camp for British officers and soldiers. The Swiss were neutral and obliged to intern personnel from either side of the conflict, who crossed their frontier to evade capture. Jung worked to improve the conditions of soldiers stranded in Switzerland and encouraged them to attend university courses.

As his work in the internment camp was not onerous, Jung also spent his time there doing spontaneous drawings which formed into mandalas.

=== Travels ===
Jung emerged from his period of isolation in the late 1910s with the publication of several journal articles, followed in 1921 with Psychological Types, one of his most influential books. There followed a decade of active publication, interspersed with overseas travels.

In addition to his international travels, in 1922, he bought some land at Bollingen in Zürich, where he built a tower. He would continue to build other additions to the building, constructing an "architectural mandala".

==== England (1920, 1923, 1925, 1935, 1938, 1946) ====
Constance Long arranged for Jung to deliver a seminar in Cornwall in 1920. Another seminar was held in 1923, this one organized by Jung's British protégé Helton Godwin Baynes (known as "Peter") (1882–1943), and another in 1925.

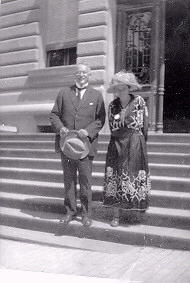
Beatrice Ensor and Jung in Montreux, Switzerland, 1923, for the Second International New Education Fellowship Conference

In 1935, at the invitation of his close British friends and colleagues, H. G. Baynes, E. A. Bennet and Hugh Crichton-Miller, Jung gave a series of lectures at the Tavistock Clinic in London, later published as part of the Collected Works.

In 1938, Jung was awarded an honorary degree by the University of Oxford.At the tenth International Medical Congress for Psychotherapy held at Oxford from 29 July to 2 August 1938, Jung gave the presidential address, followed by a visit to Cheshire to stay with the Bailey family at Lawton Mere.

In 1946, Jung agreed to become the first Honorary President of the newly formed Society of Analytical Psychology in London, having previously approved its training programme devised by Michael Fordham.

==== United States 1909–1912, 1924–1925, & 1936–1937 ====
During the period of Jung's collaboration with Freud, both visited the US in 1909 to lecture at Clark University, Worcester, Massachusetts, where both were awarded honorary degrees. In 1912, Jung gave a series of lectures at Fordham University, New York, which were published later in the year as Psychology of the Unconscious. Jung made a more extensive trip westward in the winter of 1924–25, financed and organized by Fowler McCormick and George Porter. Of particular value to Jung was a visit with Chief Mountain Lake of the Taos Pueblo near Taos, New Mexico. Jung made another trip to America in 1936, receiving an honorary degree at Harvard, and giving lectures in New York and New England for his growing group of American followers. He returned in 1937 to deliver the Terry Lectures at Yale University, later published as Psychology and Religion.

==== East Africa ====
In October 1925, Jung embarked on his most ambitious expedition, the "Bugishu Psychological Expedition" to East Africa. He was accompanied by his English friend, "Peter" Baynes, and an American associate, George Beckwith. On the voyage to Africa, they became acquainted with an English woman named Ruth Bailey, who joined their safari a few weeks later. The group traveled through Kenya and Uganda to the slopes of Mount Elgon, where Jung hoped to increase his understanding of "primitive psychology" through conversations with the culturally isolated residents of that area. Later, he concluded that the major insights he had gleaned had to do with himself and the European psychology in which he had been raised. One of Jung's most famous proposed constructs is kinship libido. Jung defined this as an instinctive feeling of belonging to a particular group or family and believed it was vital to the human experience, and used this as an endogamous aspect of the libido and what lies within the family. This is similar to a Bantu term called Ubuntu that emphasizes humanity and almost the same meaning as kinship libido, which is, "I am because you are."

==== India ====
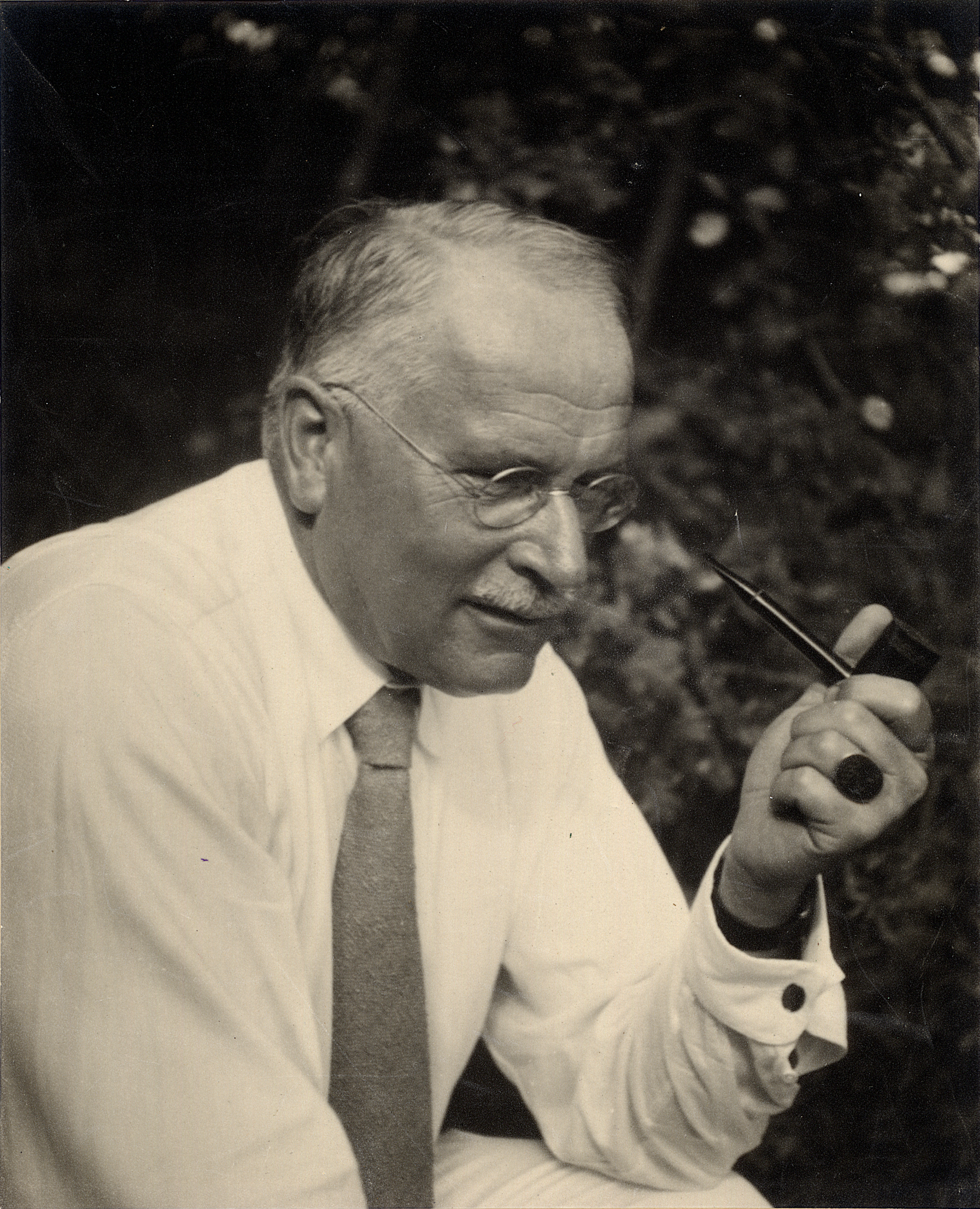
Jung in about 1935

During his 1937–1938 journey to India, Jung developed an interest in Indian philosophy and religious traditions, particularly Hinduism, Buddhism, and Advaita Vedanta, which influenced his later reflections on symbolism, the unconscious, and the concept of the Self. Jung compared Indian spiritual traditions to modern Western culture, which he described as more focused on logic and material things. He wrote that Eastern traditions preserved psychological and symbolic modes of understanding that the West had partly lost, and he expressed admiration for the philosophical depth of Indian metaphysics, yoga, and contemplative practices. At the same time, he maintained that these traditions emerged from a different cultural and psychological context, and he cautioned that their direct adoption by Westerners could be problematic without any prior psychological development through which he termed as individuation. During this visit, he declined an opportunity to meet the Advaita Vedanta sage Ramana Maharshi, for what he later explained was that he preferred to pursue insight through his own psychological work rather than through the authority of spiritual teachers. Jung discussed these thoughts in his several later writings, including Psychology and the East, The Holy Men of India, and Memories, Dreams, Reflections, where he argued that dialogue between Eastern spirituality and Western psychology could be fruitful, but that the two traditions reflected different historical paths toward understanding the human psyche and spiritual experience. He visited Vedagiriswarar Temple where he had a conversation with a local expert about the symbols and sculptures on the gopuram of this temple. He later wrote about this conversation in his book Aion. Jung became ill on this trip, suffering delirium in a Calcutta hospital. After 1938, his travels were confined to Europe.

=== Later life and death ===
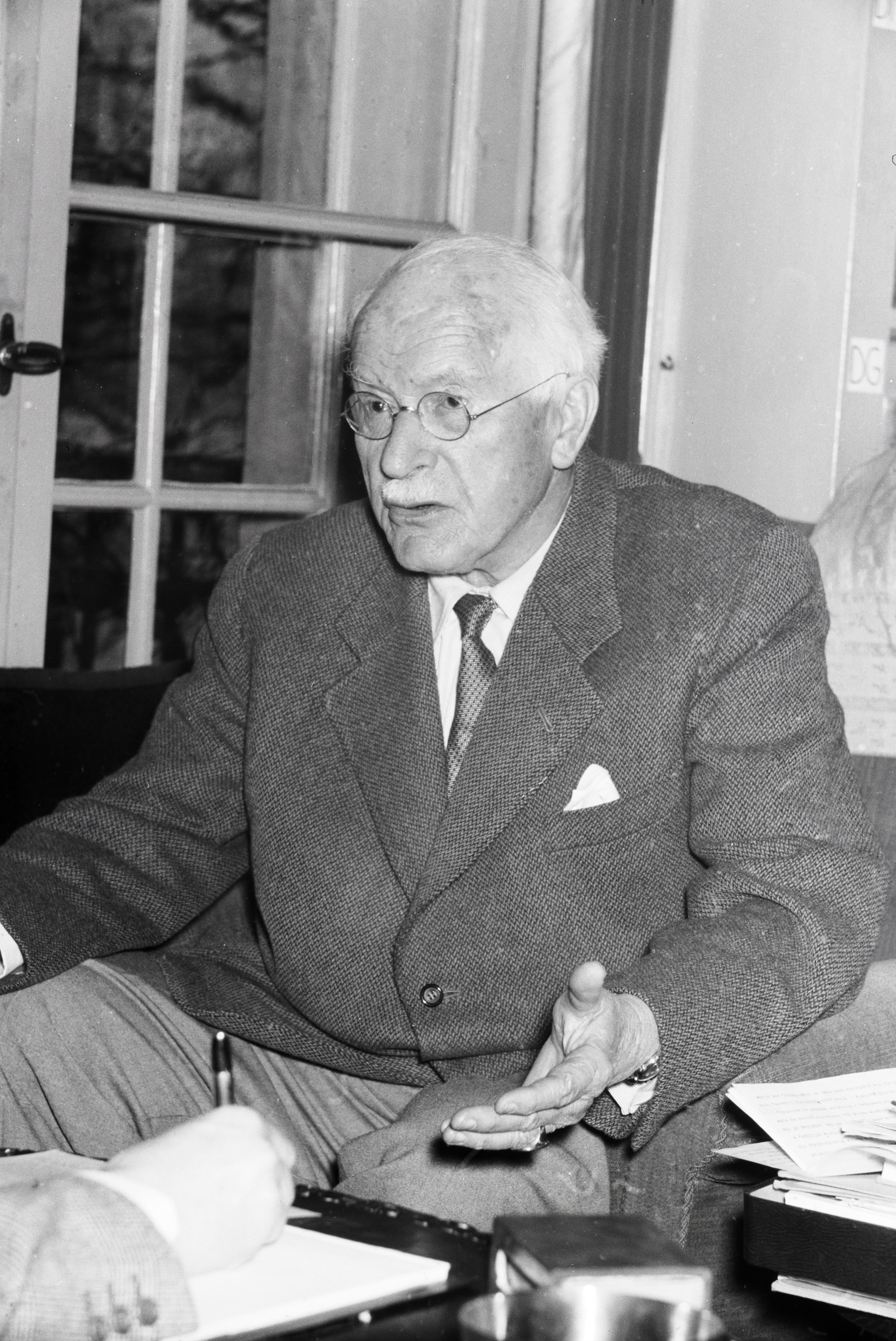
Jung in a 1955 interview

Jung became a full professor of medical psychology at the University of Basel in 1943 but resigned after a heart attack the next year to lead a more private life.

In 1945, he began corresponding with an English Roman Catholic priest, Father Victor White, who became a close friend, regularly visiting the Jungs at the Bollingen estate.

Jung became ill again in 1952.

Jung continued to publish books until the end of his life, including Flying Saucers: A Modern Myth of Things Seen in the Skies (1959), which analysed the archetypal meaning and possible psychological significance of the reported observations of UFOs. In 1961, he wrote his last work, a contribution to Man and His Symbols entitled "Approaching the Unconscious" (published posthumously in 1964).

Jung died on 6 June 1961 at Küsnacht after a short illness. He had been beset by circulatory diseases.

== Awards ==
Among his principal distinctions are honorary doctorates from:

- Clark University 1909
- Fordham University 1912
- Harvard University 1936
- University of Allahabad 1937
- University of Benares 1937
- University of Calcutta 1938
- University of Oxford 1938
- University of Geneva 1945
- Swiss Federal Institute of Technology in Zurich 1955 on his 80th birthday

In addition, he was:

- given a Literature prize from the city of Zurich, 1932
- made Titular Professor of the Swiss Federal Institute of Technology in Zurich, ETH 1935
- appointed Honorary Member of the Royal Society of Medicine 1939
- given a Festschrift at Eranos 1945
- appointed President of the Society of Analytical Psychology, London, 1946
- given a Festschrift by students and friends in 1955
- named Honorary citizen of Küsnacht 1960, on his 85th birthday

== Thought ==
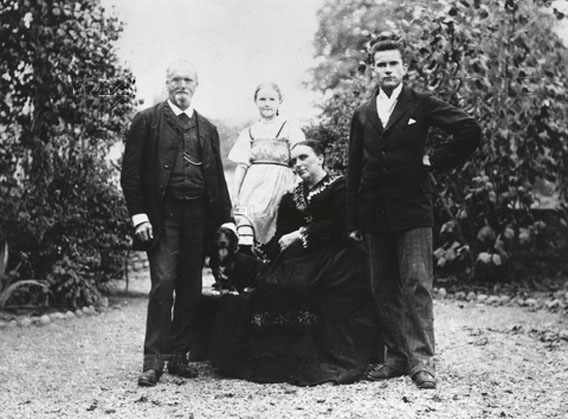
Jung's family, c. 1895: l to r. father Paul, sister Gertrud, mother Emilie and Carl

Jung's thought derived from the classical education he received at school and from early family influences, which on the maternal side were a combination of Reformed Protestant academic theology with an interest in occult phenomena. On his father's side was a dedication to academic discipline emanating from his grandfather - the physician, scientist, one-time student activist and convert from Catholicism to Swiss Reformed Protestantism, and first Basel Professor of Medicine, Karl Gustav Jung. Family lore also suggested there was at least a social connection to the German polymath, Johann Wolfgang Goethe, through the latter's niece, Lotte Kestner (known as "Lottchen") who was a frequent visitor in Jung senior's household.

Jung had, through his marriage, the economic security to pursue interests in other intellectual topics of the moment. His early celebrity as a research scientist through the Word Association Test led to the start of prolific correspondence and worldwide travel. It opened academic as well as social avenues, supported by his explorations into anthropology, quantum physics, vitalism, Eastern and Western philosophy. He delved into epistemology, alchemy, astrology, and sociology, as well as literature and the arts. Jung's interest in philosophy and spiritual subjects led many to label him a mystic, although he preferred to be seen as a man of science. Jung, unlike Freud, was deeply knowledgeable about philosophical concepts and sought links between epistemology and emergent theories of psychology.

=== Key concepts ===
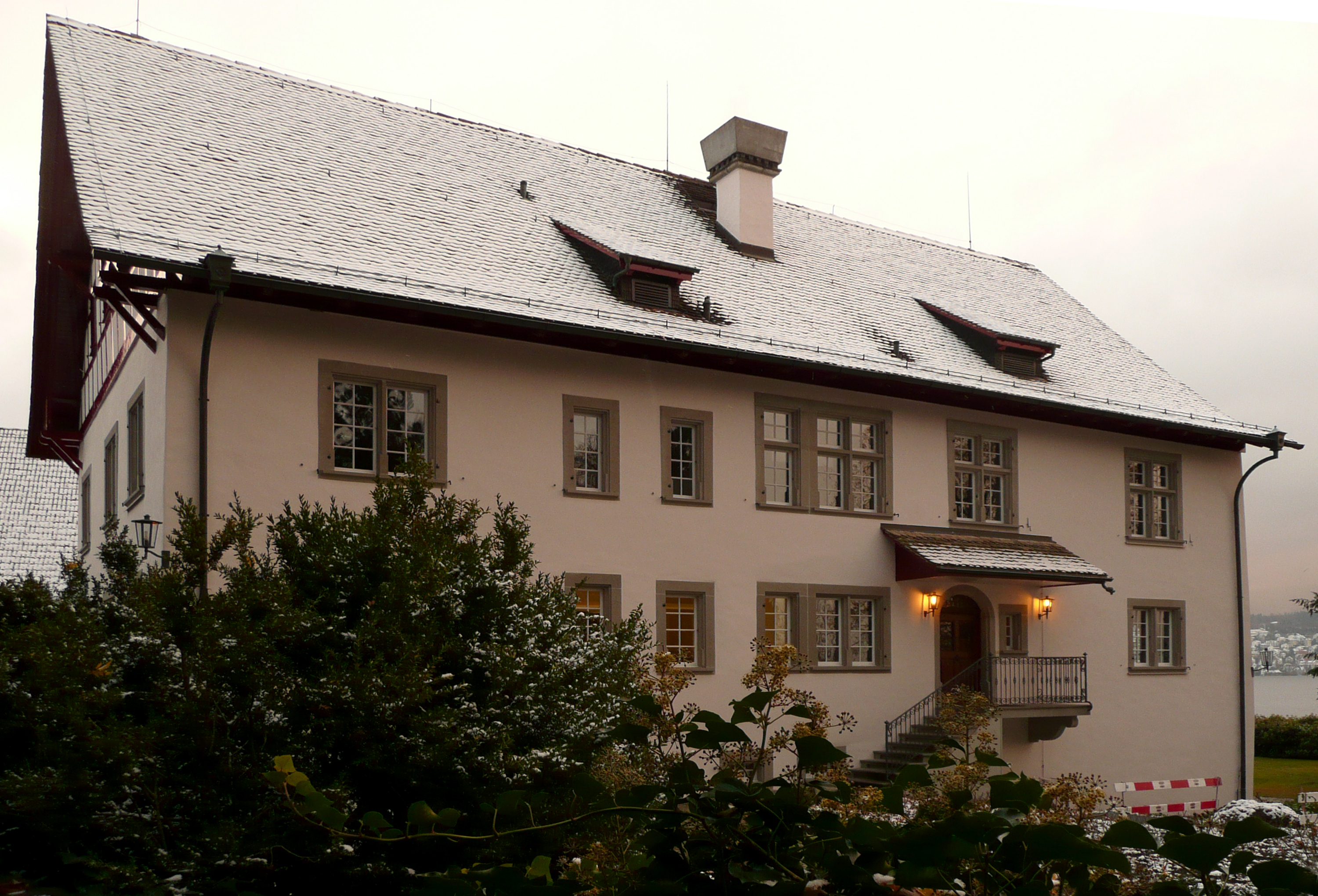
C. G. Jung Institute, Küsnacht, Switzerland

Within the field of analytical psychology, a brief survey of major concepts developed by Jung includes (alphabetical):

- Anima and animus—(archetype) the contrasexual aspect of a person's psyche. In a woman's psyche, her inner personal masculine is conceived as a complex and an archetypal image; in a man's psyche, his inner personal feminine is conceived both as a complex and an archetypal image.
- Archetype—a concept "borrowed" from anthropology to denote supposedly universal and recurring mental images or themes. Jung's descriptions of archetypes varied over time.
- Archetypal images—universal symbols that mediate opposites in the psyche, often found in religious art, mythology, and fairy tales across cultures.
- Collective unconscious—aspects of unconsciousness experienced by all people in different cultures.
- Complex—the repressed organisation of images and experiences that governs perception and behaviour.
- Extraversion and introversion—personality traits of degrees of openness or reserve contributing to psychological type.
- Individuation—the process of fulfilment of each individual "which negates neither the conscious or [sic] unconscious position but does justice to them both".
- Interpersonal relationship—the way people relate to others reflects how they relate to themselves. This may also be extended to relations with the natural environment.
- Numinous—a healing, transformative or destructive spiritual power. Also, an invisible power inherent in an object. Jung develops the concept from the work of Rudolf Otto, who based it on the Latin numen.
- Persona—element of the personality that arises "for reasons of adaptation or personal convenience"—the "masks" one puts on in various situations.
- Psychological Types—a framework for consciously orienting psychotherapists to patients by raising particular modes of personality to consciousness and differentiation between analyst and patient.
- Shadow—(archetype) the repressed, therefore unknown, aspects of the personality, including those often considered to be negative.
- Self—(archetype) the central overarching concept governing the individuation process, as symbolized by mandalas, the union of male and female, totality, and unity. Jung viewed it as the psyche's central archetype.
- Synchronicity—an acausal principle as a basis for the apparently random concurrence of phenomena.

=== Collective unconscious ===
Since the establishment of psychoanalytic theory, the notion and meaning of individuals having an unconscious, popularised by Freud, has come to be commonly accepted. An individual's personal unconscious is made up of thoughts and emotions that have, at some time, been experienced or held in mind but which have been repressed or forgotten. By contrast, the collective unconscious is neither acquired by activities within an individual's life nor is it a container of things that are thoughts, memories or ideas which are capable of being conscious during one's life. In this sense, the contents of it were never naturally "known" through physical or cognitive experience and then forgotten.

The collective unconscious consists of universal heritable elements common to all humans, distinct from other species. However, this does not necessarily imply a genetic cause, but rather encapsulates influences of evolutionary biology, the history of civilization, ethnology, brain and nervous system development, and general psychological development. Considering its composition in practical physiological and psychological terms, "it consists of pre-existent forms, the archetypes, which can only become conscious secondarily and which give definite form to certain psychic contents." Jung writes about causal factors in personal psychology as stemming from, influenced by an abstraction of the impersonal physical layer, the common and universal physiology among all humans.He considers that science would hardly deny the existence and basic nature of "instincts", existing as a whole set of motivating urges. The collective unconscious acts as the frame where science can distinguish individual motivating urges, thought to be universal across all individuals of the human species, while instincts are present in all species. Jung contends, "The hypothesis of the collective unconscious is, therefore, no more daring than to assume there are instincts."

The collective unconscious is made up of archetypes.

==== Archetype ====
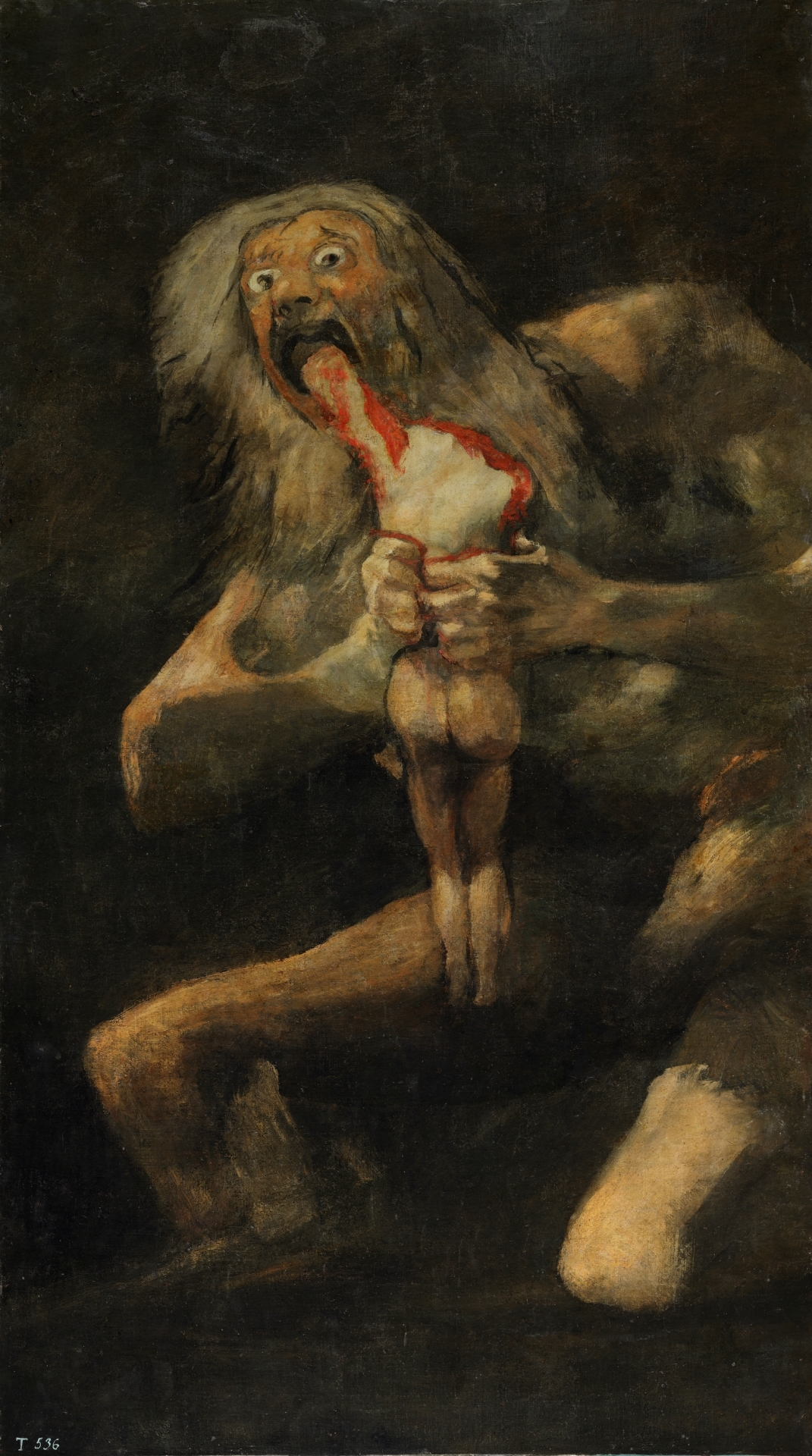
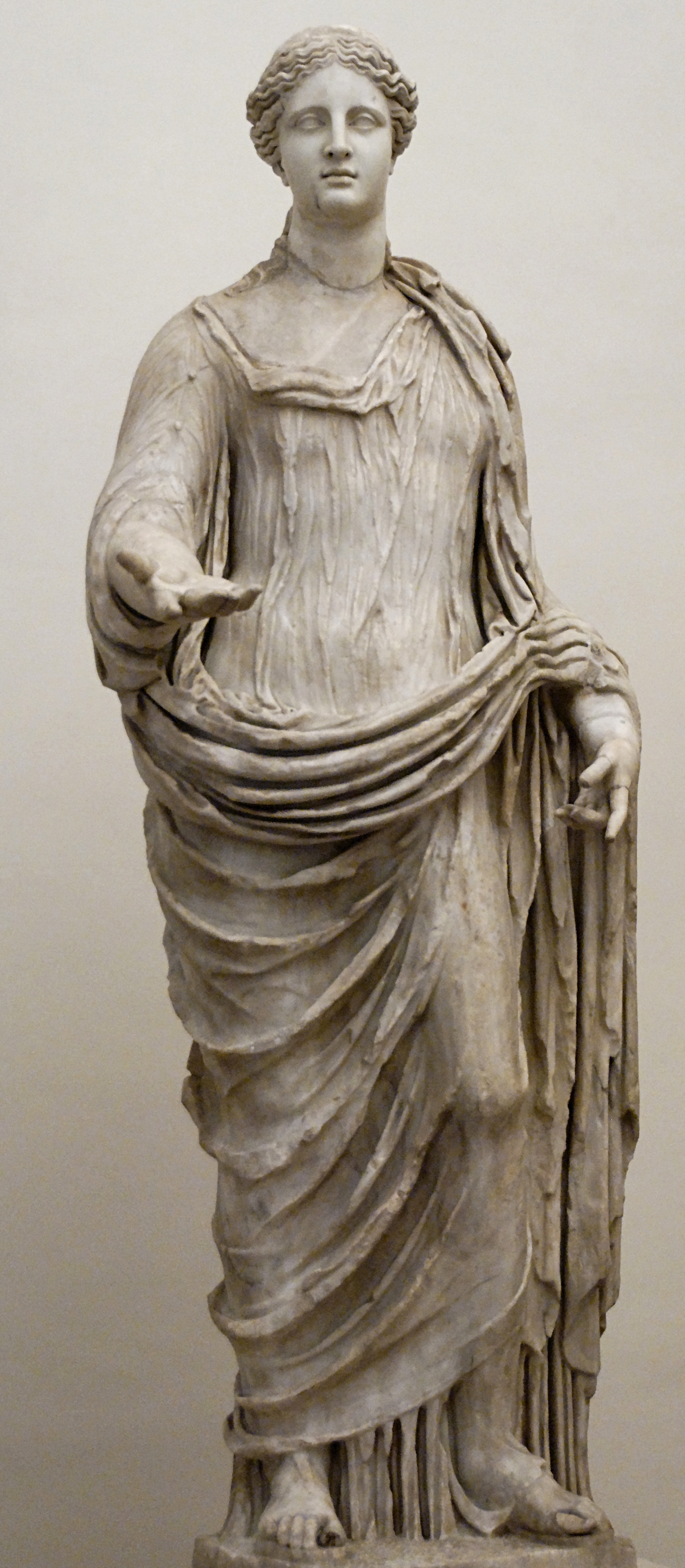
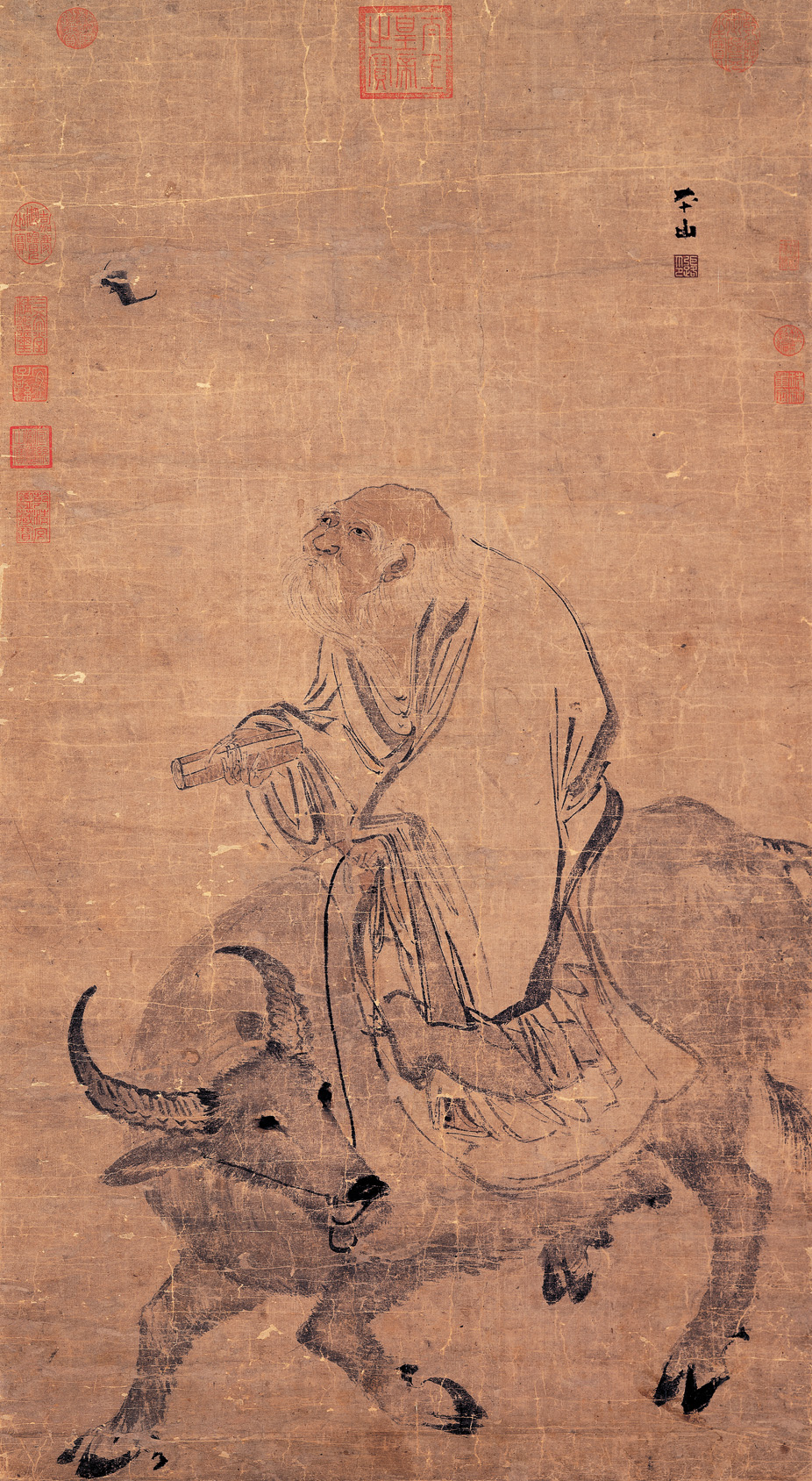
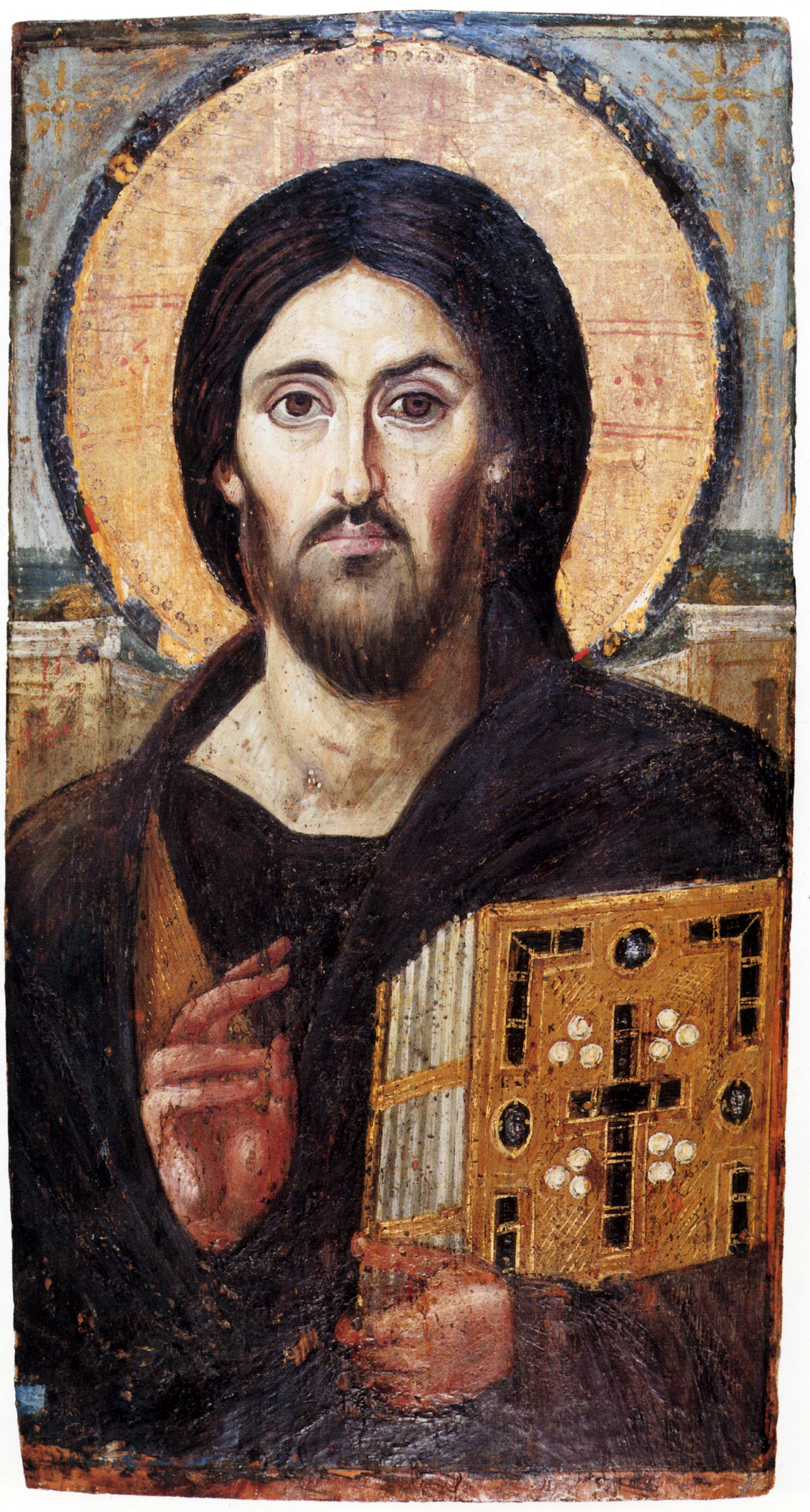
Common archetypal motifs: Devourer, Great/Benevolent Mother, Wise Old Man, Hero/Self

The archetype is a concept "borrowed" from anthropology to denote a process of nature. Jung's definitions of archetypes varied over time and have been the subject of debate regarding their usefulness. Archetypal images, also referred to as motifs in mythology, (Note: Also see other general concepts of 'motif' covering visual arts, narrative, et cetera.) are universal symbols that can mediate opposites in the psyche. They often found in religious art, mythology and fairy tales across cultures. Jung saw archetypes as pre-configurations in nature that give rise to repeating, understandable, describable experiences. They are the functional units of the collective unconscious.

The concept resembled Plato's 'ideas'. Later contributions came from Adolf Bastian and Hermann Usener, among others.In the first half of the twentieth century, it proved impossible to objectively isolate and categorise the notion of an archetype within a materialist frame. According to Jung, there are "as many archetypes as there are typical situations in life", and he asserted that they have a dynamic mutual influence on one another. Their alleged presence could be extracted from thousand-year-old narratives, from comparative religion, and from mythology.Jung elaborated on many archetypes in "The Archetypes and the Collective Unconscious" and in "Aion: Researches into the Phenomenology of the Self". Examples of archetypes might be the shadow, the hero, the self, anima, animus, mother, father, child, and trickster.

The concept of archetypes also considers the passage of time and patterns resulting from transformation.Archetypes are said to exist independently of any current event or its effect. They are said to exert influence both across all domains of experience and throughout the stages of each individual's unique development. Being in part based on heritable physiology, they are thought to have "existed" since humans became a differentiated species. They have been deduced through the development of storytelling over tens of thousands of years, indicating repeating patterns of individual and group experience, behaviours, and effects across the planet, apparently displaying common themes. Jung argued that the different stages of life (childhood, adolescence, adulthood etc.) are mediated through different archetypes.

==== Shadow ====
The shadow exists as part of the unconscious mind and is composed of the traits individuals instinctively or consciously resist identifying as their own and would rather ignore, typically repressed ideas, weaknesses, desires, instincts, and shortcomings. Much of the shadow comes as a result of an individual's adaptation to cultural norms and expectations. Thus, this archetype not only consists of all the things deemed unacceptable by society but also those things that are not aligned with one's own personal morals and values. Jung argued that each person has a desire to keep their shadow hidden under what he called the moral complex (equivalent to Freud's super-ego) and that this is the impetus for humans to learn and maintain the values of our cultures. The shadow can often appear as a dark, wild, exotic figure in dreams or visions.

Jung argues that the shadow plays a distinctive role in balancing one's overall psyche, the counter-balancing to consciousness—"where there is light, there must also be shadow". In order to truly grow as an individual, Jung believed that both the persona and shadow should be balanced. Without a well-developed shadow (often "shadow work", "integrating one's shadow"), an individual can become shallow and extremely preoccupied with the opinions of others; that is, a walking persona. Not wanting to look at their shadows directly, Jung argues, often results in psychological projection. Individuals project imagined attitudes onto others without awareness. The qualities an individual may hate (or love) in another may manifest in those who do not see the external, material truth. This projection can result in prejudice towards certain groups, and in extreme cases paranoia. As such, shadow projection can be a threat to society, and form the basis of discrimination and war. The shadow can also be hidden through repression or denial.

==== Anima and animus ====
Jung argued that the unconscious of every man contains a complementary feminine element (the anima) and every woman a complementary masculine element (the animus). Within these complementary elements exist an inherited collective image of 'man' and 'woman' respectively, which only becomes conscious in actual contacts with men and women. As such, these are archetypes of the collective unconscious. These counterparts come in part from this inherited collective image, but also partly through a person's contact with the opposite gender in their life (particularly their parental figures), and partly through the latent masculinity (for women) and femininity (for men) that a person experiences in themselves.

Like the shadow, if a person rejects their anima or animus, it is more likely to be projected outwards.

=== Psychological types ===
The foundations for Jung's typology of psychological types were in his early research at the Burghölzli Hospital. Through the Word Association Experiment, Jung provided the first empirical evidence of "complexes", observing that individuals showed distinct patterns in how they responded to emotional disturbances: some subjects were consistently oriented toward the objective meaning of the stimulus (extraverted tendency), while others were derailed by internal, subjective associations (introverted tendency). Jung interpreted what he saw as a fundamental divergence in how psychic energy (libido) moved in psychiatric patients. He noted that in hysteria, energy flowed outward toward the object, whereas in dementia praecox (schizophrenia), energy withdrew into a subjective inner world. By 1913, Jung concluded that these were not merely symptoms of illness but exaggerated manifestations of normal psychological orientations.

The further differentiation of the four psychological functions (thinking, feeling, sensation, and intuition) emerged from Jung's period of intense self-experimentation between 1913 and 1917. Documented in The Red Book (Liber Novus), Jung utilised the method of active imagination to observe his own mental processes. This introspection allowed him to map how certain functions dominate consciousness while their opposites remain "inferior" and unconscious. By comparing these personal findings with the case histories of his patients, Jung moved from a simple two-fold model (extraversion/introversion) to the complex eight-fold functional system published in 1921.

Jung identified two primary 'attitudinal types'—introvert and extrovert. While the terms 'introversion' and 'extraversion' had prior use in European thought, Jung was the first to integrate them into a comprehensive structural theory of personality. He redefined these concepts not merely as social traits, but as fundamental directions of psychic energy (libido), establishing the first systematic model of psychological types based on the movement of psychic energy libido toward the subject or the object.

In Psychological Types, Jung defined the primary attitudinal types (introvert and extrovert), comparing them to the ancient archetypes: Apollo and Dionysus. The introvert is likened to Apollo, who shines a light on understanding. The introvert is focused on the internal world of reflection, dreaming, and vision. Thoughtful and insightful, the introvert can sometimes be uninterested in joining the activities of others. The introvert's libido flows inwards towards subjective factors and is influenced by 'inner necessity'. By contrast, the extravert is associated with Dionysus, interested in joining the activities of the world. The extravert is focused on the outside world of objects, sensory perception, and action. Energetic and lively, the extravert may lose their sense of self in the intoxication of Dionysian pursuits. For the extravert, the libido flows outwards, and the person has an interest, relationship and dependence on events, people and things.

Jung's concepts of introversion and extraversion differ fundamentally from their common usage in modern trait psychology. While contemporary models, such as the Big Five or psychometric adaptations such as Hans Eysenck's PEN model, often define these terms through social behavioural traits (such as shyness, gregariousness, sociability and impulsivity), Jung defined them as 'directional orientations of libido.' Modern theories often stay true to behaviourist means of describing such a trait (sociability, talkativeness, assertiveness etc.), whereas Jungian introversion and extraversion are expressed as a perspective: introverts interpret the world subjectively, whereas extraverts interpret the world objectively.

Jung also posited different functions of consciousness: two perceiving/non-rational functions: sensation and intuition; and two judging/rational functions: thinking and feeling. These are modified (or combined with) the two main attitudinal types (introversion and extroversion) to produce eight distinct psychological types: extraverted sensing, introverted sensing, extraverted intuiting, introverted intuiting, extraverted thinking, Introverted thinking, extraverted feeling, and introverted feeling. Whilst Jung posits these different types, he argues that it is rare that a person is an absolutely 'pure' type, and more likely a person has a main function, but also has a secondary function which blurs the picture. The secondary type is known as the 'inferior type' and is often associated with the shadow.

Although it is not acknowledged in Psychological Types, it is likely that Jung's theory of psychological types was influenced by Alfred Binet's distinction between two intellectual attitudes: 'introspection' and 'externospection'.

=== Persona ===
In his psychological theory—which is not necessarily linked to a particular theory of social structure—the persona appears as a consciously created personality or identity, fashioned out of part of the collective psyche through socialisation, acculturation and experience. Jung applied the term persona because, in Latin, it means both personality and the masks worn by Roman actors of the classical period, expressive of the individual roles played. The persona, he argues, is a mask for the "collective psyche", a mask that 'pretends' individuality so that both self and others believe in that identity, even if it is really no more than a well-played role through which the collective psyche is expressed. It has also been referred to as the social archetype or the conformity archetype.

Jung regarded the "persona-mask" as a complicated system that mediates between individual consciousness and the social community: it is "a compromise between the individual and society as to what a man should appear to be". But he also makes it quite explicit that it is, in substance, a character mask in the classical sense known to theatre, with its double function: both intended to make a certain impression on others and to hide (part of) the true nature of the individual, which he calls the 'shadow'. The therapist then aims to assist the individuation process through which the client (re)gains their "own self"—by liberating the self, both from the deceptive cover of the persona and from the power of unconscious impulses.

=== Sex and Gender ===
Jung believed in biologically based psychological differences between males and females. He articulated this view in his distinction between Eros or feminine psychology and Logos or masculine psychology. While he acknowledged that both Eros and Logos exist in males and females, in Jung's view Eros is more characteristic of female psychology and Logos of male psychology, and hence these categories retain 'statistical validity'. As Jung writes when reflecting on the genetic basis of these differences:

Just as every individual derives from masculine and feminine genes, and the sex is determined by the predominance of the corresponding genes, so in the psyche it is only the conscious mind, in a man, that has the masculine sign, while the unconscious is by nature feminine. The reverse is true in the case of a woman. All I have done in my anima theory is to rediscover and reformulate this fact. It had long been known.

Jung's position on biologically based sex differences in psychological orientation has become an issue of contention within contemporary Jungian and post-Jungian scholarship. For example, numerous scholars inspired by postmodernism and gender theory, have rejected this aspect of Jung's thinking as an expression of sexist and patriarchal stereotypes. Others have countered this position, arguing that Jung rejected a tabula rasa (blank slate) or social constructionist view of the human mind and sex differences, and that his theory of sex differences is supported by contemporary evolutionary theory, cross-cultural anthropological data and experimental psychology. As one author has commented, reflecting on this debate, the postmodern approach to sex and gender in post-Jungian scholarship 'goes against the grain of [Jung's] entire oeuvre…It is a betrayal of his legacy.'

=== Anthropology and Race ===
In developing his psychological theories, Jung extensively studied the anthropological and ethnographic field work available to him at the time. This aspect of his work has become contentious and has spawned a significant body of scholarship. Some scholars argue that the anthropological theories that Jung relied on, as well as Jung's thinking itself, are implicated in colonial and racist conceptions of Indigenous and pre-modern cultures in which they were constructed as inferior to Europeans. Others have argued that such an approach oversimplifies both early anthropology as well as Jung's use of it, and that as a consequence Jung's anthropological thought retains relevance for contemporary evolutionary conceptions of the human mind.

For example, Jung drew heavily on the ethnographic field work of Spencer and Gillen, who from 1896 to 1903 undertook extensive field work amongst the Arrernte people of Central Australia. While Spencer and Gillen's works were influenced by the surrounding prejudices of colonial culture, they also enabled the broader community to understand Indigenous culture and thereby help overcome those prejudices, understanding that continues to the present particularly in the relevance of their research to contemporary anthropology. Given the contemporary relevance of Spencer and Gillen's field work, particularly in relation to the Indigenous concept of the Dreaming, it has been argued that Jung's theories retain their relevance.

Another factor that critics have focused on is Jung's use of anthropological 'stage theory' and colonial conceptions of history and the psychology of pre-modern cultures. This theory postulated various stages that human cultures go through from hunter-gathering to settled villages and complex hierarchical civilizations. While it has been subject to criticism the theory has been adopted by numerous contemporary anthropologists. Consequently, given the continuing relevance of anthropological stage theory, it has been argued that Jung's anthropological thought, despite elements of colonial racism, nevertheless still offers researchers an evidence-based paradigm for psychological approaches to evolutionary anthropology. As one scholar has commented, we should not, based on a simplistic analysis of the anthropological thought that inspired Jung, throw 'the anthropological baby out with the colonial bathwater.' The same author argues that Jung's anthropological theories provide an explanatorily powerful framework for analysing anthropological field data and particularly that associated with ritual life, shamanism, altered states of consciousness and traditional psychedelic plant use.

=== Evolutionary thought ===
Of his early years, Jung would write that "mentally my greatest adventure had been the study of Kant and Schopenhauer. The great news of the day was the work of Charles Darwin." While Jung's conception of human psychology is grounded in Darwinian evolutionary theory, his evolutionary thought had a distinctively German quality to it. This is because the idiosyncratic reception of Darwin in late nineteenth and early twentieth-century Germany resulted in the integration of Darwin's ideas with German embryological and developmental traditions formulated by the Naturphilosophen and theorists such as Ernst Haeckel. These traditions formed the intellectual background of Jung's evolutionary thought.

The result was that Jung's evolutionary conception of mind focused on embryology and development. From this perspective, the emergence of consciousness both in ontogeny (development) and phylogeny (evolution) was built upon much more archaic, affect-based subcortical brain systems. This developmental approach to evolution underpinned his "archaeological" conception of the human psyche, consisting of different evolutionary layers, from the deeply archaic to the more evolutionarily recent. Those more archaic structures in the brain, Jung believed, were the basis of the "collective unconscious"—an aspect of human psychology shared by all members of the species Homo sapiens.

In commenting on humanity's evolution from an ancient primate ancestor, Jung wrote: "We keep forgetting that we are primates and that we have to make allowances for these primitive layers in our psyche." Jung also developed the notion of different evolutionary layers in the psyche in his discussion of fossil hominins such as Pithecanthropus (Homo erectus). As he writes:

For just as a man has a body that is no different in principle from that of an animal, so also his psychology has a whole series of lower storeys in which the spectres from humanity's past epochs still dwell, then the animal souls from the age of Pithecanthropus and the hominids, then the "psyche" of the cold-blooded saurian.

Jung's notion of different evolutionary layers in the human mind has been compared with the work of neuroscientist Jaak Panksepp, particularly as outlined in his book The Archaeology of Mind: Neuroevolutionary Origins of Human Emotions. Of these affinities it has been suggested that 'Jung and Panksepp have, independently it seems, developed similar metaphors of an archeologically layered psyche in which jewels and treasures are discoverable in the deepest phylogenetically ancient regions of the brain – for Jung they are archetypal structures for Panksepp cross-species homologies.'

Significantly, in a 2017 article entitled "The Affective Core of the Self: A Neuro-Archetypical Perspective on the Foundations of Human (and Animal) Subjectivity", when noting Jung's belief that archetypes may be related to evolutionarily ancient subcortical brain systems, Panksepp and colleagues wrote that "such assertions by Jung were not only quite farsighted, but they actually open ways to connect his theory of the psyche with the most advanced scientific theories and discoveries of our day."

=== Spirituality ===
Jung's work on himself and his patients convinced him that life has a spiritual purpose beyond material goals. The main task for people, he believed, is to discover and fulfill their deep, innate potential. Based on his study of Christianity, Hinduism, Buddhism, Gnosticism, Taoism, and other traditions, Jung believed this journey of transformation, which he called individuation, is at the mystical heart of all religions. It is a journey to meet the self and at the same time to meet the Divine. Unlike Freud's atheistic worldview, Jung's pantheism may have led him to believe that spiritual experience was essential to well-being, as he specifically identifies individual human life with the universe as a whole.

In 1959, Jung was asked by the host, John Freeman, on the BBC interview program Face to Face whether he believed in God, to which Jung answered, "I do not need to believe. I know." Jung's ideas on religion counterbalance Freudian skepticism. Jung's idea of religion as a practical road to individuation is still treated in modern textbooks on the psychology of religion, though his ideas have been criticized.

Jung recommended spirituality as a cure for alcoholism, and is considered to have had an indirect role in establishing Alcoholics Anonymous. Jung treated an American patient named Rowland Hazard III who had chronic alcoholism. After working with the patient for some time and achieving no significant progress, Jung told the man that his alcoholic condition was near hopeless, save only the possibility of a spiritual experience. Jung noted that, occasionally, such experiences had been known to reform alcoholics when all other options had failed. Hazard took Jung's advice seriously and sought a personal, spiritual experience. He returned to the United States and joined a Christian evangelical movement known as the Oxford Group. He told other alcoholics what Jung had told him about the importance of a spiritual experience. One of the alcoholics he brought into the Oxford Group was Ebby Thacher, a long-time friend and drinking buddy of William Griffith Wilson, later co-founder of Alcoholics Anonymous. Thacher told Wilson about the Oxford Group, and through them, Wilson became aware of Hazard's experience with Jung. The influence of Jung thus indirectly found its way into the formation of Alcoholics Anonymous, the original twelve-step program.

The above claims are documented in the letters of Jung and Wilson. Although some historians dispute the detail, Jung discussed an Oxford Group member, who may have been the same person, in talks around 1940. The remarks were distributed privately in transcript form, from shorthand taken by an attender (Jung reportedly approved the transcript), and later recorded in his Collected Works, "For instance, when a member of the Oxford Group comes to me in order to get treatment, I say, 'You are in the Oxford Group; so long as you are there, you settle your affair with the Oxford Group. I can't do it better than Jesus.'" Jung goes on to state he has seen similar cures among Roman Catholics. The 12-step program of Alcoholics Anonymous has a psychological backdrop involving the human ego and the dichotomy between the conscious and unconscious mind.

=== Inquiries into the paranormal ===
Jung had an apparent interest in the paranormal and occult. For decades, he attended seances and claimed to have witnessed "parapsychic phenomena". Initially, he attributed these to psychological causes, even delivering a 1919 lecture in England for the Society for Psychical Research on "The Psychological Foundations for the belief in spirits". However, he began to "doubt whether an exclusively psychological approach can do justice to the phenomena in question" and stated that "the spirit hypothesis yields better results". Still, he retained some skepticism toward his own postulation, as he could not find material evidence of the existence of spirits.

Jung's ideas about the paranormal culminated in "synchronicity". This is the idea that certain coincidences manifest in the world, have exceptionally intense meaning to observers. Such coincidences have a great effect on the observer from multiple cumulative aspects: from the immediate personal relevance of the coincidence to the observer, from the peculiarities of (the nature of, the character, novelty, curiosity of) any such coincidence; from the sheer improbability of the coincidence, having no apparent causal link (hence Jung's essay subtitle "An Acausal Connecting Principle"). Despite his own experiments failing to confirm the phenomenon he held on to the idea as an explanation for apparent ESP. In addition, he proposed it as a functional explanation for how the I-Ching worked. However, he was never clear about how synchronicity worked.

=== Interpretation of quantum mechanics ===
Jung influenced one philosophical interpretation (not the science) of quantum physics with the concept of synchronicity regarding some events as non-causal. That idea influenced the physicist Wolfgang Pauli (with whom, via a letter correspondence, Jung developed the notion of unus mundus in connection with the idea of nonlocality) and some other physicists.

=== Alchemy ===
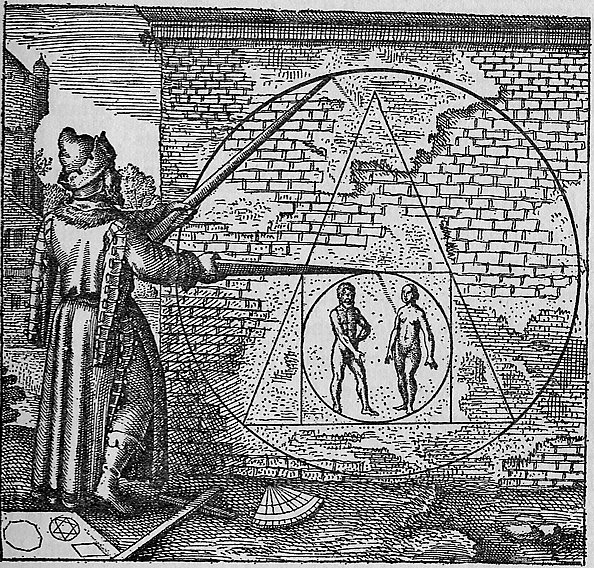
The mythic alchemical philosopher's stone as pictured in Atalanta Fugiens Emblem 21

Jung's acquaintance with alchemy came between 1928 and 1930 when he was introduced to a manuscript of The Secret of the Golden Flower, translated by Richard Wilhelm. The work and writings of Jung from the 1930s onwards shifted to a focus on the psychological significance of alchemy.

In 1944, Jung published Psychology and Alchemy, in which he analyzed the alchemical symbols and came to the conclusion that there is a direct relationship between them and the psychoanalytical process. (Note: 'For Jung, alchemy is not only part of the pre-history of chemistry, that is, not only laboratory work, but also an essential part of the history of psychology as the history of the discovery of the deep structure of the psyche and its unconscious. Jung emphasized the significance of the symbolic structure of alchemical texts, a structure that is understood as a way independent of laboratory research, as a structure per se.' Calian, George Florin (2010). Alkimia Operativa and Alkimia Speculativa. Some Modern Controversies on the Historiography of Alchemy. Budapest: Annual of Medieval Studies at CEU. pp. 167–168.) He argued that the alchemical process was the transformation of the impure soul (lead) to perfected soul (gold), and a metaphor for the individuation process.

In 1963, Mysterium Coniunctionis first appeared in English as part of The Collected Works of C. G. Jung. Mysterium Coniunctionis was Jung's last major book and focused on the "Mysterium Coniunctionis" archetype, known as the sacred marriage between the sun and moon. Jung argued that the stages of the alchemists, the blackening, the whitening, the reddening, and the yellowing, could be taken as symbolic of individuation—his chosen term for personal growth (75).

=== Therapy ===
After his period of psychological transformation and his later discovery of alchemy, Jung saw analysis as more of a tool for personal growth than treatment for certain mental disorders.

Whereas Freud mainly gleaned or tested his theories on a small group of upper-middle-class patients, mainly women suffering from (what was thought to be at the time) hysteria, Jung had seen patients from all walks of life and with a huge diversity of diagnoses.Jung believed psychosis (schizophrenia) and neurosis (hysteria) to be extreme expressions of the two basic attitudinal types. The psychotic patient's libido has withdrawn so far from external reality that they inhabit a private world of fantasy and archetypal imagery (the unconscious). The neurotic patient's libido has been directed so far away from internal reality that they become hugely preoccupied with their own influence on the world and social relationships (i.e., they live in their persona). In this sense, Jung saw all mental illness as forms of imbalance. He also saw mental illness as a creative act, in that it is a product of the individuation process whereby the psyche is continuing to grow and develop in abnormal psychic circumstances. Thus, the purpose of psychotherapy, for Jung, was individuation and to find a more balanced mode of existence.

Influenced by Freud's psychoanalysis, Jung saw the analysis of dreams as essential to Jungian analysis. However, particularly after his separation from Freud, Jung's ideas surrounding dreams departed in significant ways from Freud's theory. In particular, Jung argued that dreams are best used in analysis with the methods of amplification and active imagination, rather than by interpretation through free association (as Freud proposed). Jung saw dreams as serving individuation by making unconscious material available to the whole personality.

Jung originated the idea of therapy as a dialectical process - a two-way process where both parties are equally involved. He saw it was important to see the patient as a real person rather than a sick inferior. In this way, he also saw himself as not having all the answers and saw the process of a patient finding their own answers as much more valuable. He made a point of not being dogmatic in his approach and treating each patient as the individual they are. As such, he disregarded group therapies.

Jung saw analysis as having four stages:

1. Confession: the initial experience of catharsis the patient experiences as a result of sharing secrets and private experiences.
2. Elucidation: similar to Freud's interpretation, the examination of symptoms and transference phenomena, and the location of areas of failed development.
3. Education: the insights of stages (1) and (2) start to be seen in the patient's life, and there is an improved ability to adapt to society's demands
4. Transformation: Individuation commences and 'selfhood' begins, which also involves a confrontation with the shadow, anima/animus, and other archetypal components.

Unlike traditional Freudian analysis, which requires an analyst to see their patient five times a week, Jung saw his patients twice a week, and then reduced this to one, also taking breaks every ten or so weeks. He saw what the patient did in their time outside of the sessions as equally, if not more, important than their time in the sessions. He also saw a reliance on the therapist as something that would thwart the patient's progress, so this method prevented this. The breaks also help the analyst to keep vitality in their life and their therapy practice, not being reduced by the work (or 'burnt out' as we now call it).

Jung saw it as an imperative for trainees of psychotherapy to have their own analysis, and after qualifying continue to undertake self-analysis.

==== Art therapy ====
Jung proposed that art can be used to alleviate or contain feelings of trauma, fear, or anxiety and also to repair, restore, and heal. In his work with patients and his own personal explorations, Jung wrote that art expression and images found in dreams could help recover from trauma and emotional distress. At times of emotional distress, he often drew, painted, or made objects and constructions, which he recognised as more than recreational. He also encouraged his patients to paint their psychic images.

==== Dance/movement therapy ====
Dance and movement therapy, as a form of active imagination, was developed by Jung and Toni Wolff in 1916 and practiced by Tina Keller-Jenny and other analysts. It remained largely unknown until the 1950s when it was rediscovered by Marian Chace and therapist Mary Whitehouse. Whitehouse, after studying with Martha Graham and Mary Wigman, became a dancer and teacher of modern dance, and, along with Swiss dancer Trudi Schoop, is considered one of the founders of dance/movement therapy in the U.S.

=== Political views ===
==== The state ====
Jung stressed the importance of individual rights in a person's relation to the state and society. He saw that the state was treated as "a quasi-animate personality from whom everything is expected" but that this personality was "only camouflage for those individuals who know how to manipulate it". He referred to the state as a form of slavery. He also thought that the state "swallowed up [people's] religious forces",and therefore that the state had "taken the place of God"—making it comparable to a religion in which "state slavery is a form of worship". Jung observed that "stage acts of [the] state" are comparable to religious displays:

Brass bands, flags, banners, parades and monster demonstrations are no different in principle from ecclesiastical processions, cannonades and fire to scare off demons.

From Jung's perspective, this replacement of God with the state in a mass society leads to the dislocation of the religious drive and results in the same fanaticism of the church-states of the Dark Ages—wherein the more the state is 'worshipped', the more freedom and morality are suppressed; this ultimately leaves the individual psychically undeveloped with extreme feelings of marginalization.

==== Service to the Allies during World War II ====
Jung was in contact with Allen Dulles of the Office of Strategic Services (predecessor of the Central Intelligence Agency) and provided valuable intelligence on the psychological condition of Hitler. Dulles referred to Jung as "Agent 488" and offered the following description of his service: "Nobody will probably ever know how much Professor Jung contributed to the Allied Cause during the war, by seeing people who were connected somehow with the other side". Jung's service to the Allied cause through the OSS remained classified after the war.

=== Relationship to Nazism and antisemitism ===
Various statements made by Jung in the 1930s have been cited as evidence of both contempt and sympathy for Nazism.

In 1933, after the Nazis gained power in Germany, Jung became the president of the new International General Medical Society for Psychotherapy (Allgemeine Ärztliche Gesellschaft für Psychotherapie); the professional body aimed to have affiliated organizations in different countries. The German affiliated organization was the Deutsche Allgemeine Ärztliche Gesellschaft für Psychotherapie, led by Matthias Göring, an Adlerian psychotherapist, and a cousin of the prominent Nazi Hermann Göring, excluded Jews. In 1933, the society's journal, Zentralblatt für Psychotherapie, published a statement endorsing Nazi positions, and Hitler's book Mein Kampf. Jung's response to this was twofold.

In "The State of Psychotherapy Today", published in 1934 in the Zentralblatt für Psychotherapie, Jung wrote: "The Aryan unconscious has a greater potential than the Jewish unconscious" and "The Jew, who is something of a nomad, has never yet created a cultural form of his own and as far as we can see never will". Andrew Samuels argues that his remarks on the "Aryan unconscious" and the "corrosive character" of Freud's "Jewish gospel" demonstrate a form of antisemitism "fundamental to the structure of Jung's thought" but also argues that there is a "pioneering nature of Jung's contributions" and that "his intuition of the importance of exploring difference remains intact."

In 1934, in a circular for the society, Jung also drew attention to its constitution, which permitted individual doctors to join directly rather than through one of the national affiliated societies. This meant that German Jewish doctors could maintain their professional status as individual members of the international body, even though they were excluded from the German affiliate, as well as from other German medical societies operating under the Nazis. Jung said, "The main point is to get a young and insecure science into a place of safety during an earthquake."

On the other hand, also in 1934, Jung wrote in a Swiss publication, the Neue Zürcher Zeitung, that he experienced "great surprise and disappointment" when the Zentralblatt associated his name with the pro-Nazi statement. He did not end his relationship with the Zentralblatt at this time, but he did arrange the appointment of a new managing editor, Carl Alfred Meier of Switzerland. For the next few years, the Zentralblatt under Jung and Meier maintained a position distinct from that of the Nazis in that it continued to acknowledge the contributions of Jewish doctors to psychotherapy. In the face of energetic German attempts to Nazify the international body, Jung resigned from its presidency in 1939, the year the Second World War started.

Scholar Yosef Hayim Yerushalmi believed that Jung's antisemitism may have contributed to the schism between Freud and his circle of psychoanalysts, who were predominantly Jews.

Jung is known to have possessed an interest in the Jewish mystic tradition of Kabbalah. and his interest in European mythology and folk psychology was shared by the Nazis. Richard Noll describes Jung's own reaction to this connection:

Jung clearly identifies himself with the spirit of German Volkstumsbewegung throughout this period and well into the 1920s and 1930s, until the horrors of Nazism finally compelled him to reframe these neopagan metaphors in a negative light in his 1936 essay on Wotan.

In "Wotan", Jung described the influence of Adolf Hitler on Germany as "one man who is obviously 'possessed' has infected a whole nation to such an extent that everything is set in motion and has started rolling on its course towards perdition." He would later say, during a lengthy interview with H. R. Knickerbocker in October 1938:

Hitler seemed like the 'double' of a real person, as if Hitler the man might be hiding inside like an appendix, and deliberately so concealed in order not to disturb the mechanism ... You know you could never talk to this man; because there is nobody there ... It is not an individual; it is an entire nation.

In an interview in 1949, Carl Jung said,

It must be clear to anyone who has read any of my books that I have never been a Nazi sympathizer and I never have been anti-Semitic, and no amount of misquotation, mistranslation, or rearrangement of what I have written can alter the record of my true point of view. Nearly every one of these passages has been tampered with, either by malice or by ignorance. Furthermore, my friendly relations with a large group of Jewish colleagues and patients over a period of many years in itself disproves the charge of anti-Semitism.

However, after the war Jung reportedly apologized to several of his Jewish colleagues, friends, and patients regarding his past statements about Jews.

=== Views on homosexuality ===
Jung addressed homosexuality in his published writings, in one comment specifying that homosexuality should not be a concern of legal authorities nor be considered a crime. He also stated that homosexuality does not reduce the value of a person as a member of society. Jung also said that homosexuality is a result of psychological immaturity ("nurture"), but only if one's sexuality is not an aspect of their constitutional characteristics ("nature").

=== Psychedelics ===
Jung's theories are considered to be a useful therapeutic framework for the analysis of unconscious phenomena that become manifest in the acute psychedelic state. This view is based on correspondence Jung had with researchers involved in psychedelic research in the 1950s, as well as more recent neuroimaging research where subjects who are administered psychedelic compounds seem to have archetypal religious experiences of "unity" and "ego dissolution" associated with reduced activity in the default mode network.

This research has led to a re-evaluation of Jung's work, particularly the visions detailed in The Red Book, in the context of contemporary psychedelic, evolutionary, and developmental neuroscience. For example, in a chapter entitled "Integrating the Archaic and the Modern: The Red Book, Visual Cognitive Modalities and the Neuroscience of Altered States of Consciousness", in the 2020 volume Jung's Red Book for Our Time: Searching for Soul Under Postmodern Conditions, Volume 4, it is argued Jung was a pioneer who explored uncharted "cognitive domains" that are alien to Western modes of thought. While such domains of experience are not part of mainstream Western culture and thought, they are central to various Indigenous cultures that use psychedelics such as Iboga and Ayahuasca during rituals to alter consciousness. The author writes: "Jung seems to have been dealing with modes of consciousness alien to mainstream Western thought, exploring the terrain of uncharted cognitive domains. I argue that science is beginning to catch up with Jung who was a pioneer whose insights contribute a great deal to our emerging understanding of human consciousness." In this analysis, Jung's paintings of his visions in The Red Book were compared to the paintings of Ayahuasca visions by the Peruvian shaman Pablo Amaringo.

Commenting on research that was being undertaken during the 1950s, Jung wrote the following in a letter to Betty Eisner, a psychologist who was involved in LSD research at the University of California: "Experiments along the line of mescaline and related drugs are certainly most interesting since such drugs lay bare a level of the unconscious that is otherwise accessible only under peculiar psychic conditions. It is a fact that you get certain perceptions and experiences of things appearing either in mystical states or in the analysis of unconscious phenomena."

An account of Jung and psychedelics, as well as the importance of Jungian psychology to psychedelic-assisted therapies, is outlined in Scott Hill's 2013 book Confrontation with the Unconscious: Jungian Depth Psychology and Psychedelic Experience. A 2021 article discusses Jung's attitude towards psychedelics, as well as the applicability of his ideas to current research. As the author writes, Jung's "...legitimate reservations about the clinical use of psychedelics are no longer relevant as the field has progressed significantly, devising robust clinical and experimental protocols for psychedelic-assisted therapies. That said, Jung's concept of individuation—that is the integration of the archaic unconscious with consciousness—seems extremely pertinent to modern psychedelic research." The author also uses work in evolutionary and psychedelic neuroscience, and specifically the latter's ability to make manifest ancient subcortical brain systems, to illuminate Jung's concept of an archaic collective unconscious that evolved before the ego complex and the uniquely human default mode network.

== Legacy ==
A Review of General Psychology survey, published in 2002, ranked Jung as the 23rd most cited psychologist of the 20th century. The list however focused on U.S. journals and was made by the psychology department of Arkansas State University.

Although psychoanalysis is still studied in the humanities, a 2008 study in The Journal of the American Psychoanalytic Association found that psychology departments and textbooks treat it as "desiccated and dead". Similarly, Alan Stone noted, "As academic psychology becomes more 'scientific' and psychiatry more biological, psychoanalysis is being brushed aside."

=== Personality Tests ===
Jung has influenced management theory because managers and executives create an appropriate "management persona" (a corporate mask) and a persuasive identity, and they have to evaluate what sort of people the workers are, to manage them (for example, using personality tests and peer reviews).

The Myers–Briggs Type Indicator (MBTI), a psychometric instrument mostly popular with non-psychologists, as well as the concepts of socionics, were developed from Jung's model of psychological types. The MBTI is considered pseudoscience and is not widely accepted by researchers in the field of psychology.

=== Alcoholics Anonymous ===
Jung is considered a "godparent" of the altruistic, mutual self-help movement, Alcoholics Anonymous. Jung told Rhode Island businessman and politician Rowland Hazard III, who had come under his care for the first time in 1926, that the only chance he might have to recover was through a "spiritual or religious experience" or "genuine conversion," which Hazard later had, through the Oxford Group and the Emmanuel Movement, and, according to some sources, never drank again.

Hazard, in turn, helped Ebby Thatcher, another alcoholic, get sober, with help from the Oxford Group. Thatcher brought Jung's ideas to a third alcoholic, Bill W., who consequently co-founded Alcoholics Anonymous with Dr. Bob. Years later, Bill W. corresponded with Jung, in 1961, thanking him for helping to inspire the organization. Of Hazard, the alcoholic who came under his care, Jung wrote: "His craving for alcohol was the equivalent, on a low level, of the spiritual thirst of our being for wholeness, expressed in medieval language: the union with God."

Jung concludes his letter to Bill W.:

"You see, "alcohol" in Latin is spiritus, and you use the same word for the highest religious experience as well as for the most depraving poison. The helpful formula therefore is: spiritus contra spiritum."

=== Religion and spirituality ===
Jung saw the human psyche as "by nature religious" and made this idea a principal focus of his explorations. His influence on the "psychologization of religion", spirituality, and the New Age movement has been immense.

== In popular culture ==
=== Literature ===
==== Books in which Jung is a character in the narrative ====
- Laurens van der Post was an Afrikaner author who claimed to have had a 16-year friendship with Jung, from which books and a film were created about Jung. The accuracy of van der Post's claims about his relationship to Jung has been questioned.
- In his novel The World is Made of Glass (1983), Morris West gives a fictional account of one of Jung's cases, placing the events in 1913. According to the author's note, the novel is "based upon a case recorded, very briefly, by Carl Gustav Jung in his autobiographical work Memories, Dreams, Reflections".
- Pilgrim, a supernatural novel in which Jung is a character.
- Possessing the Secret of Joy, a novel in which Jung is a therapist character.
- The Interpretation of Murder, a novel focused on Sigmund Freud in which he solves a murder in New York City.

==== Fiction that references Jung's theories ====
- Hermann Hesse, author of works such as Siddhartha and Steppenwolf, was treated by Joseph Lang, a student of Jung. For Hesse this began a long preoccupation with psychoanalysis, through which he came to know Jung personally.
- The Canadian novelist Robertson Davies made Jungian analysis a central part of his 1970 novel The Manticore. He stated in a letter, "There have been other books which describe Freudian analyses, but I know of no other that describes a Jungian analysis" adding "I was deeply afraid that I would put my foot in it, for I have never undergone one of those barnacle-scraping experiences, and knew of it only through reading. So, I was greatly pleased when some of my Jungian friends in Zurich liked it very much."
- The psychological novel E.E. written by Olga Tokarczuk draws from Jung's doctoral dissertation On the Psychology and Pathology of So-Called Occult Phenomena. Jung is not a character in this story, but Jung's views on the occult are extensively cited.

=== Art ===
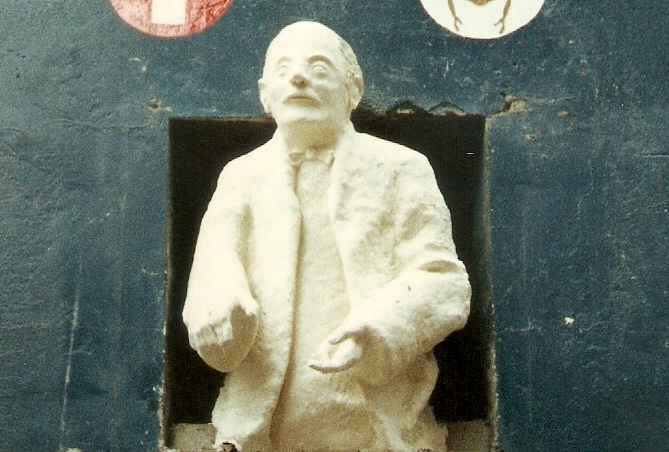
Original statue of Jung in Mathew Street, Liverpool, a half-body on a plinth captioned "Liverpool is the pool of life"

- The visionary Swiss painter Peter Birkhäuser was treated by a student of Jung, Marie-Louise von Franz, and corresponded with Jung about the translation of dream symbolism into works of art.
- American abstract expressionist Jackson Pollock underwent Jungian psychotherapy in 1939 with Joseph Henderson. Henderson engaged Pollock through his art, having him make drawings, which led to the appearance of many Jungian concepts in his paintings.
- Contrary to some sources, Jung did not visit Liverpool but recorded a dream in which he did, and of which he wrote, "Liverpool is the pool of life, it makes to live." A plaster statue of Jung was erected in Mathew Street in 1987 that was vandalised and replaced by a more durable version in 1993.

=== Music ===
- Musician David Bowie described himself as Jungian in his relationship to dreams and the unconscious. Bowie sang of Jung on his album Aladdin Sane (a pun on "a lad insane") and attended the exhibition of The Red Book in New York with artist Tony Oursler, who described Bowie as "reading and speaking of the psychoanalyst with passion". Bowie's 1967 song "Shadow Man" encapsulates a key Jungian concept, while in 1987 Bowie described the Glass Spiders of Never Let Me Down as Jungian mother figures around which he not only anchored a worldwide tour but also created an enormous onstage effigy.
- British rock band the Police released an album titled Synchronicity in 1983.
- The American rock band Tool was influenced by Jungian concepts in its album Ænima, the title a play on the concepts of anima and animus. In the song "Forty Six & 2", the singer seeks to become a more evolved self by exploring and overcoming his Shadow.
- Jung's texts influenced Argentinian musician Luis Alberto Spinetta in his 1975 conceptual album Durazno sangrando, specifically the songs "Encadenado al ánima" and "En una lejana playa del ánimus", which deal with anima and animus.
- Jung appeared on the front cover of The Beatles' Sgt. Pepper's Lonely Hearts Club Band.
- He is referenced in The Streets song the "Irony of it All" from the album Original Pirate Material.
- The South Korean band BTS's 2019 album Map of the Soul: Persona is based on Jung's Map of the Soul, which gives the basic principles of Jung's analytical psychology. It includes an intro song titled "Persona" rapped by group leader RM, who asks, "who am I?", and is confronted with various versions of himself with the words "persona", "shadow", and "ego", referring to Jung's theories. On 21 February 2020, the band released Map of the Soul: 7, which specifically focuses on Jung's "shadow" and "ego" theories. As part of the first phase of the band's comeback, "Interlude: Shadow", rapped by Suga and released on 10 January, addresses the shadows and the darkness that go hand-in-hand with the light and attention shone on celebrities. The next comeback trailer, "Outro: Ego", performed by J-Hope, ends with his declaration of self and ego as he appears within a colourful city "in which the artist's current image is projected".
- In 2019, Italian rapper Marracash released the album Persona, which features many Jungian themes.
- Jung appeared on the cover art of the 2008 single "Metanoia" by American psychedelic rock band MGMT.
- Composer John Zorn released his composition Liber Novus inspired by Jung's Red Book in 2010 on the Tzadik CD Dictée/Liber Novus.
- English rock musician Peter Gabriel's song The Rhythm of the Heat from his 1982 album, is directly based on Carl Jung's experiences during his time in Africa. The working title for the song was "Jung in Africa".
- Peruvian musician Daniela Lalita has cited Jung's archetype of the "Great Mother" as a major influence on her works Madre and Trececerotres. In Peru, this manifests in the worship of Pachamama, the earth and fertility goddess, who symbolizes the close connection to nature and reflects the collective unconscious of Andean culture.
- Canadian black metal band Panzerfaust used the Jungian concept of the 'Shadow' in the title of their 2024 record "To Shadow Zion"

=== Theatre, film, television, and radio ===
==== Films in which Jung is a character in the narrative ====
- 2002 saw the release of an Italian film about Jung and Spielrein, The Soul Keeper (Prendimi l'Anima) directed by Roberto Faenza. It used English dialogue and English actors, but was never formally released in the United States. Emilia Fox played Sabina Spielrein and Iain Glen was Carl Gustav Jung.
- A Dangerous Method, a 2011 film directed by David Cronenberg, is a fictional dramatisation of the lives of Freud, Jung, and Sabina Spielrein between 1904 and 1913. Spielrein is the Russian woman who became Jung's lover and student and, later, an analyst herself. Michael Fassbender plays Carl Jung. The film is based on the stage play The Talking Cure by Christopher Hampton, which was in turn based on the 1993 non-fiction book by John Kerr, A Most Dangerous Method: The Story of Jung, Freud, and Sabina Spielrein.
- In the online animated series, Super Science Friends, Jung, voiced by Tom Park, is featured as one of the recurrent antagonists against Sigmund Freud.
- Soul, a 2020 Pixar film written by Pete Docter, Mike Jones and Kemp Powers, includes brief appearances of Jung as an ethereal cartoon character, "Soul Carl Jung".
- Jeff Lillico portrays Jung in episode 13 of season 15 "Murdoch on the Couch" (10 January 2022) of the Canadian television period detective series Murdoch Mysteries.

==== Documentaries ====
- The BBC interviewed Jung for Face to Face with John Freeman at Jung's home in Zurich in 1959.
- Stephen Segaller produced a documentary on Jung as part of his "World of Dreams", Wisdom of the Dream in 1985. It was re-issued in 2018. It was followed by a book of the same title.
- Matter of Heart (1986) is a documentary about Jung featuring interviews with those who knew him and archival footage.
- On 2 December 2004, BBC Radio 4's In Our Time broadcast a program on "the mind and theories" of Jung.

==== Film, stage, and television influenced by Jung's ideas ====
- Federico Fellini brought to the screen exuberant imagery shaped by his encounter with Jung's ideas, especially Jungian dream interpretation. Fellini preferred Jung to Freud because Jungian analysis defined the dream not as a symptom of a disease that required a cure but rather as a link to archetypal images shared by all of humanity.
- Stanley Kubrick's 1987 film Full Metal Jacket has an underlying theme about the duality of man. In one scene, a colonel asks a soldier, "You write 'Born to Kill' on your helmet and you wear a peace button. What's that supposed to be, some kind of sick joke?" The soldier replies, "I think I was trying to suggest something about the duality of man, sir...the Jungian thing, sir." (The colonel in this scene is played by the brother of famed Jungian psychologist Marion Woodman.)
- In the 1994 Frasier episode, "Frasier Crane's Day Off", Niles fills in for his brother, declaring: "Although I feel perfectly qualified to fill Frasier's radio shoes, I should warn you that while Frasier is a Freudian, I am a Jungian. So there'll be no blaming Mother today."
- Robert Eggers's 2019 psychological thriller The Lighthouse has elements strongly influenced by Jung's work, with Eggers hoping that "it's a movie where both Jung and Freud would be furiously eating their popcorn".

=== Video games ===
- The Persona series of games is heavily based on Jung's theories, representing the shadow, the persona, and archetype.
- The Nights into Dreams series of games is heavily based on Jung's theories.
- Jungian concepts are present in the Xeno series, including Xenogears; its reimagination as the Xenosaga trilogy; and a graphic novel, Perfect Works, published by the game's creator.
- The game Control is heavily influenced by Carl Jung's ideas, particularly synchronicity and shadow selves.
- Alan Wake takes inspiration from Carl Jung's ideas of archetype and individuation.
- The game Reverse: 1999 adapts Jungian concepts into its worldbuilding, particularly using the Collective unconscious as the conceptual basis of its alternate dimension, the Depths of Myth. Carl Jung is also mentioned in one of its patch versions, A Flowing Feast, when explaining and connecting the terminologies together.

== Bibliography ==
=== Books ===
- 1910 Conflicts in the Child's Soul (Note: This work is also cited by Jung himself as "Psychic Conflicts in a Child". See, for example, Symbols of Transformation pg. 23 and 249.)
- 1912 Psychology of the Unconscious
- 1916 Seven Sermons to the Dead (a part of the Red Book, published privately)
- 1921 Psychological Types
- 1933 Modern Man in Search of a Soul (essays)
- 1944 Psychology and Alchemy
- 1951 Aion: Researches into the Phenomenology of the Self
- 1952 Symbols of Transformation (revised edition of Psychology of the Unconscious)
- 1954 Answer to Job
- 1956 Mysterium Coniunctionis: An Inquiry into the Separation and Synthesis of Psychic Opposites in Alchemy
- 1957 The Undiscovered Self
- 1959 Flying Saucers: A Modern Myth of Things Seen in the Skies (Translated by R. F. C. Hull)
- 1960 Synchronicity: An Acausal Connecting Principle
- 1962 Memories, Dreams, Reflections (autobiography, co-written with Aniela Jaffé)
- 1964 Man and His Symbols (Jung contributed one part, his last writing before his death in 1961; the other four parts are by Marie-Louise von Franz, Joseph L. Henderson, Jaffé, and Jolande Jacobi)
- 2009 The Red Book: Liber Novus (manuscript produced c. 1915–1932)
- 2020 Black Books (private journals produced c. 1913–1932, on which the Red Book is based)

=== Collected Works ===
Editors: Herbert Read, Michael Fordham, Gerhard Adler. Executive ed.: W. McGuire. Trans.: R.F.C. Hull. London: Routledge Kegan Paul (1953–1980).

1. Psychiatric Studies (1902–1906)
2. Experimental Researches (1904–1910) (trans L. Stein and D. Riviere)
3. Psychogenesis of Mental Disease (1907–1914; 1919–1958)
4. Freud and Psychoanalysis (1906–1914; 1916–1930)
5. Symbols of Transformation (1911–1912; 1952)
6. Psychological Types (1921)
7. Two Essays on Analytical Psychology (1912–1928)
8. Structure and Dynamics of the Psyche (1916–1952)
9.1 Archetypes and the Collective Unconscious (1934–1955)
9.2 Aion: Researches into the Phenomenology of the Self (1951)
10. Civilization in Transition (1918–1959)
11. Psychology and Religion: West and East (1932–1952)
12. Psychology and Alchemy (1936–1944)
13. Alchemical Studies (1919–1945)
14. Mysterium Coniunctionis (1955–1956)
15. Spirit in Man, Art, and Literature (1929–1941)
16. The Practice of Psychotherapy (1921–1925)
17. The Development of Personality (1910; 1925–1943)
18. The Symbolic Life: Miscellaneous Writings
19. General Bibliography
20. General Index

Supplementary volumes

A. The Zofingia Lectures
B. Psychology of the Unconscious (trans. Beatrice M. Hinckle)

Seminars

Analytical Psychology (1925)
Dream Analysis (1928–1930)
Visions (1930–1934)
The Kundalini Yoga (1932)
Nietzsche's Zarathustra (1934–1939)
Children's Dreams (1936–1940)

== See also ==
Houses and institutions

- C. G. Jung House Museum
- Bollingen Tower
- Psychology Club Zürich
- C. G. Jung Institute, Zürich
- Society of Analytical Psychology

Organizations

- International Association for Analytical Psychology
- International Association for Jungian Studies
