= Über Konflikte der kindlichen Seele =

1910 book by Carl Gustav Jung

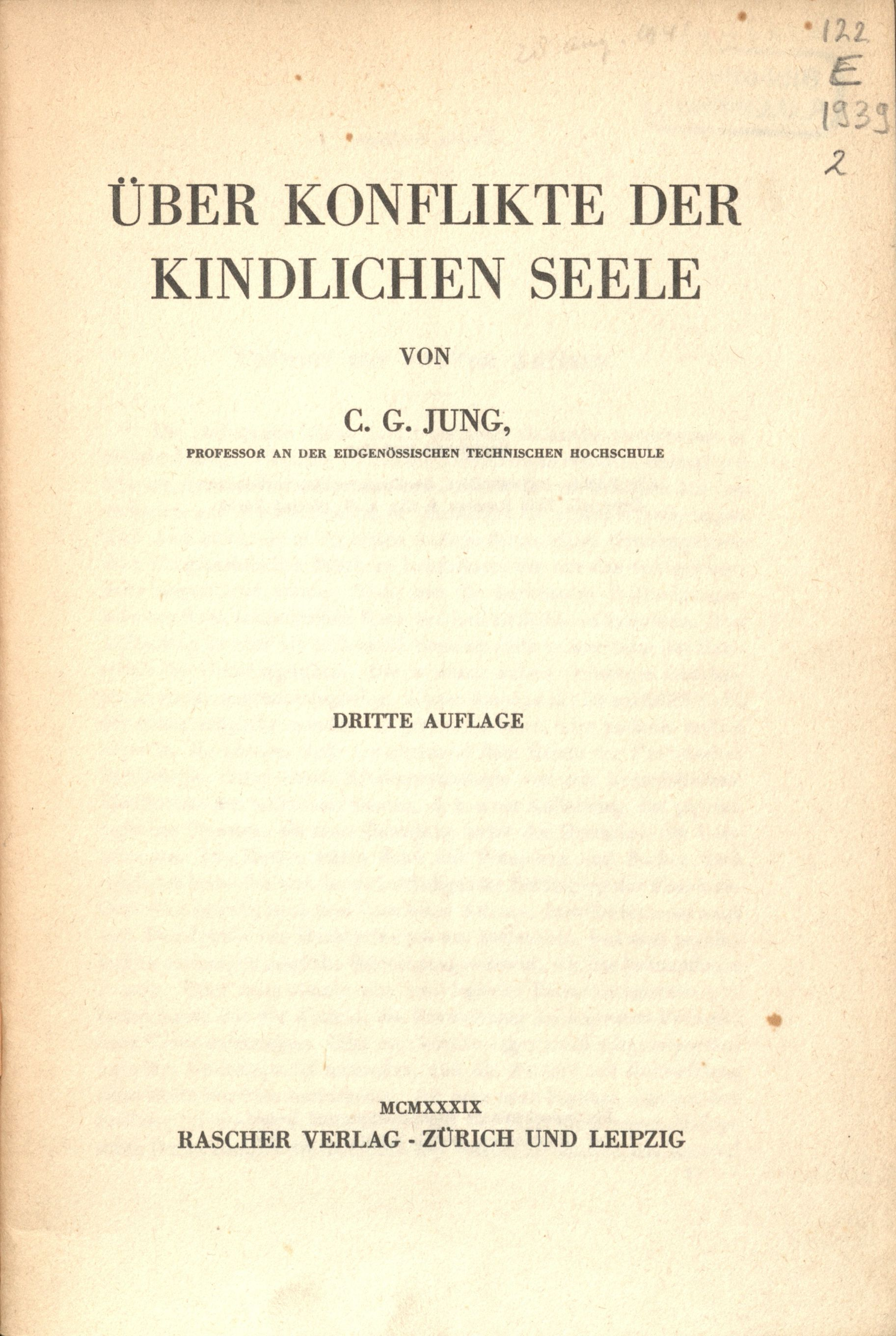
- Author: Carl Gustav Jung
- Original title: Über Konflikte der kindlichen Seele
- Working title: About the conflicts of a child's soul
- Language: German
- Subject: Child psychology, infantile sexuality, psychoanalysis
- Genre: Non-fiction
- Published: Leipzig
- Publication date: 1910
- Publication place: Switzerland (author's nationality)
- Jung published modified versions in 1915 and 1938. Complements Freud's Little Hans

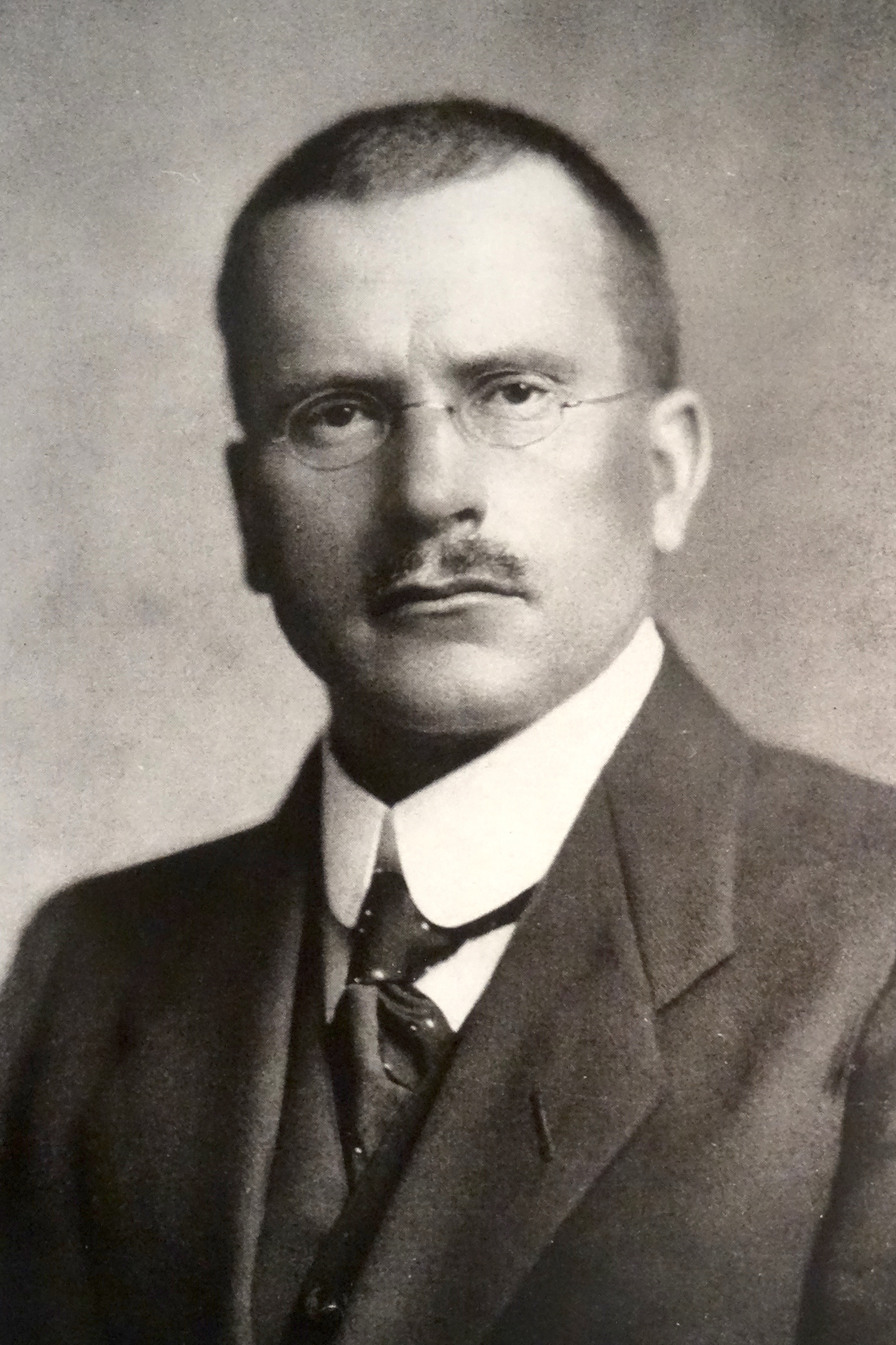
Carl Gustav Jung

Über Konflikte der kindlichen Seele (English: About the conflicts of a child's soul) was published in Leipzig in 1910 by the Swiss psychiatrist Carl Gustav Jung. In this book, Jung processes statements from a four-year-old girl that provide deep insight into the meaning of sexual interest. He discusses the problems that arise over the years, the conflicts they create as well as the solutions that help and those that do not.

== Context ==
After studying medicine at the University of Basel Jung worked at the Burghölzli Asylum of the University of Zürich. At Burghölzli he began to apply association tests initiated by earlier researchers and was especially interested in patients' illogical responses to stimulus words. Jung observed that these specific responses were caused by emotionally charged clusters of associations that were restrained from consciousness because of their obnoxious and often sexual content. Jung's findings confirmed many of Freud's ideas. Together they were close collaborators for five years. Jung held important positions in the psychoanalytic movement and is widely known as the most likely successor to the founder of psychoanalysis. Due to temperamental reasons and differences of viewpoint Freud's and Jung's collaboration ended. Jung disagreed with Freud's insistence on the sexual bases of neurosis. Three years prior to the end of his collaboration with Freud Jung published Über Konflikte der kindlichen Seele. It was written during the period of Jung's editorship of the Yearbook for Psychoanalytical and Psychopathological Research and his position as chairman of the International Psychoanalytical Association. Jung's goal was to complement Freud's case of Der kleine Hans (English: Little Hans), which, in Freud's view, was the first to provide evidence for infantile sexuality as "the (constitutional) common property of all human beings". In the case of Der kleine Hans from 1909 Freud analyses the beginning, process and the apparent solution of a horse phobia of a five-year-old child named Hans. In Über Konflikte der kindlichen Seele Jung it is mentioned that the observations he made have so much in common with Freud's information about "Little Hans" that he could not refrain from making this material accessible to a wider audience.

== Content ==
In the book, Jung discusses several observations made by a father about his four-year-old daughter Anna. Jung chronologically talks about Anna's behavior over two years and explains it by retracing her thought process.

When Anna's mother is pregnant Anna starts questioning her parents about where babies come from, which is the core question discussed throughout the book. Anna's search for the answer to this question influences her behavior in many ways. She builds her own theories, finds new information, which leads to a renewal of her theories. Anna is in a constant process of adjusting her knowledge. At first, she comes up with the theory that old people turn into angels when they die and then become children again. But since her mother did not die after she gave birth to Anna's little brother, she rejects this theory. After asking her mother where her brother came from, Anna gets the explanation that the baby grew inside of her mother just like a flower growing out of the ground. Anna figures that he must have come out of either the hole in her mother's breast or through her mouth. This raises the question, of how her brother got into the mother's body in the first place. For Anna, it makes perfect sense, that everything that lands in the body has to enter it through the mouth. This leads to her thinking, that swallowing a whole orange will make Anna pregnant since she will have a huge belly just as pregnant women do. Another question that arises is the purpose of the father in the process of having a baby. After her father tells her, that he cannot have a baby Anna starts thinking about an alternative purpose for him. Her main inference at the end of the book is that her father's genitals must be important in the whole process.

Jung's conclusion regarding the education of children is, that parents should not use false theories in order to explain something to their children since this can cause serious distrust. Also, it is not useful to insist on the correct explanations of difficult topics, because it suppresses the freedom of a child's thought development. Early education, even about sexual topics, is not problematic since it relieves a child's fantasy and avoids that this fantasy negatively impacts the free development of thinking.

== Editions ==
Jung modified Über Konflikte der kindlichen Seele three times and his perspective on this topic changed from version to version. In his first version from 1910, the influence of Freud's drive theory is clearly noticeable. The same year that Jung publishes this version, he is elected president of International Psychoanalytic Association. Three years later he resigns as president and has his final break with Freud. In 1915 he publishes the second version of the book in which he strongly invalidates the theses he had expressed under Freud's influence. Although he continues to assign sexual interest a causal role in the development process of children's thinking, he believes that this child's sexual interest does not necessarily strive for an immediate sexual goal. Rather this interest strives for the development of thinking, which is why the solution to this conflict does not need the granting of a sexual goal. Over the next years he continues to publish books about unconscious processes and instincts. In his third version from 1938 he mentions that in the field of psychology, theories can be highly devastating. He explains that we need certain theoretical points of view, but they should be seen as mere auxiliary ideas that can be put aside at any time.

== Reception ==
Together with Sigmund Freud and Alfred Adler, Jung was very influential in the field of depth psychology, which is closely related to the topic of sexuality. Together with Kleiner Hans, Über Konflikte der kindlichen Seele was one of the first books that write about sexuality of children. In Jung's opinion infants and young children are psychologically a part of the parents' psyche. He claims that a child's psychological disorder is exclusively caused by disturbances in the psychic sphere of the parents. This statement, which emphasizes the importance of parents for early childhood development, was not widespread at Jung's time. It is also partly confirmed in modern research on young children. Some psychologists such as child psychiatrist and Jungian analyst Michael Fordham, did not fully agree with Jung's statement. He states that a child should be seen as its own psychological individual. It should not be seen as merely an appendage of the parental psyche. When Freud presented a phase of development characterized by a lack of experience with objects in his essay Zur Einführung des Narzissmus (English: Introduction of Narcissism), he also referred to the concept of an introversion of the libido, which Jung introduced in Über Konflikte der kindlichen Seele. Freud differentiated the meaning of this concept in many ways in his work Wandlungen und Symbole der Libido (English: Changes and Symbols of Libido).

In 1977 Jung's book was mentioned in psychology magazines such as Neue Bücher zur Seelsorge und Psychologie (English: New books about pastoral care and psychology). Jung's explanations of Anna's dreams where also mentioned in books such as Die Sprache des Traumes by Wilhelm Stekel, which is a textbook about interpreting dreams, written for doctors and psychologist. Almost 100 years after publishing Über Konflikte der kindlichen Seele, Jung's findings and statements are still being proved and used, for example for psychodynamic family therapy and family counseling.
