= Jungian neuroscience =

The theories of Carl Jung are grounded in his evolutionary conception of human brain evolution. This had led to a resurgence of research into his work, beginning in the early 2000s, from the perspective of contemporary neuroscience. Much of this work looks at Jung's theories of a genetically inherited 'collective unconscious' common to all of humankind. This hypothesis was postulated by Jung in his efforts to account for similar patterns of behaviour and symbolic expression in myth, dream imagery and religion in various cultures around the world. Jung believed that the 'collective unconscious' was structured by archetypes – that is species typical patterns of behaviour and cognition common to all humans. Contemporary researchers have postulated such recurrent archetypes reside in 'environmentally closed' subcortical brain systems that evolved in the human lineage prior to the emergence of self-consciousness and the uniquely human self-reflective ego.

== Jung's theories of brain evolution ==
In a lecture given in 1957 at the Second International Conference for Psychiatry in Zurich, Jung wrote:

I have long thought that, if there is any analogy between psychic and physiological processes, the organizing system of the brain must lie subcortically on the brain stem. This conjecture arose out of considering the psychology of an archetype [the Self] of central importance and universal distribution represented in mandala symbols. … The reason that lead me to conjecture a localization of a physiological basis for this archetype in the brain stem was the psychological fact that besides being specifically characterized by the ordering and orienting role, its uniting properties are predominantly affective. I would conjecture that such a subcortical system might somehow reflect characteristic of the archetypal form of the unconscious.

Throughout his career Jung developed this notion and applied it frequently in his analysis mythic and cultural symbolism as well as clinical treatments. One of his main arguments was that this ancient genetically inherited aspect of the brain was dissociated from more recently evolved regions associated with the human ego complex. For him the goal of therapy was to integrate this more ancient emotionally based subcortical brain system with the more recently evolved ego complex and its capacities for self-conscious awareness and rational insight. It was such integration that formed the basis of his theory of individuation
