= Soul flight =

Shamanic practice

Soul flight is a technique of ecstasy used by shamans with the aim of entering into a state of trance. During such ecstatic trance it is believed that the shaman's soul has left the body and the corporeal world (compare out-of-body experience) which allows him or her to enter a spiritual world and interact with its denizens. Believing themselves to be travelling into other realms, shamans either descend into an underworld (cf. katabasis or nekyia) or ascend unto an upper world (cf. anabasis) - usually by means of an axis mundi (sometimes actually depicted in concrete form in the accompanying ritual) - and indeed they can, in a sense, be said to be flying through such divine or infernal realms.

By means of such trance states, shamans profess to provide services for their fellow tribespeople and one of the techniques they employ in order to achieve such ASCs is soul flight. They alter their consciousness to connect with the spirit world, which is considered to be the source of their knowledge and power. Among the many services that practitioners believe may be rendered by means of soul flight are: healing, divination, protection, clairvoyance, dream interpretation, mediation between the human and the divine, communicating with spirits of the dead (séance), and escorting deceased souls to the afterlife (psychopomp).

Soul flight, also known as shamanic journeying or magical flight, has been exercised from paleolithic times to the present day. With the passing of time this shamanic practice has evolved into a way for the individual to transcend themselves.

== Theoretical background ==
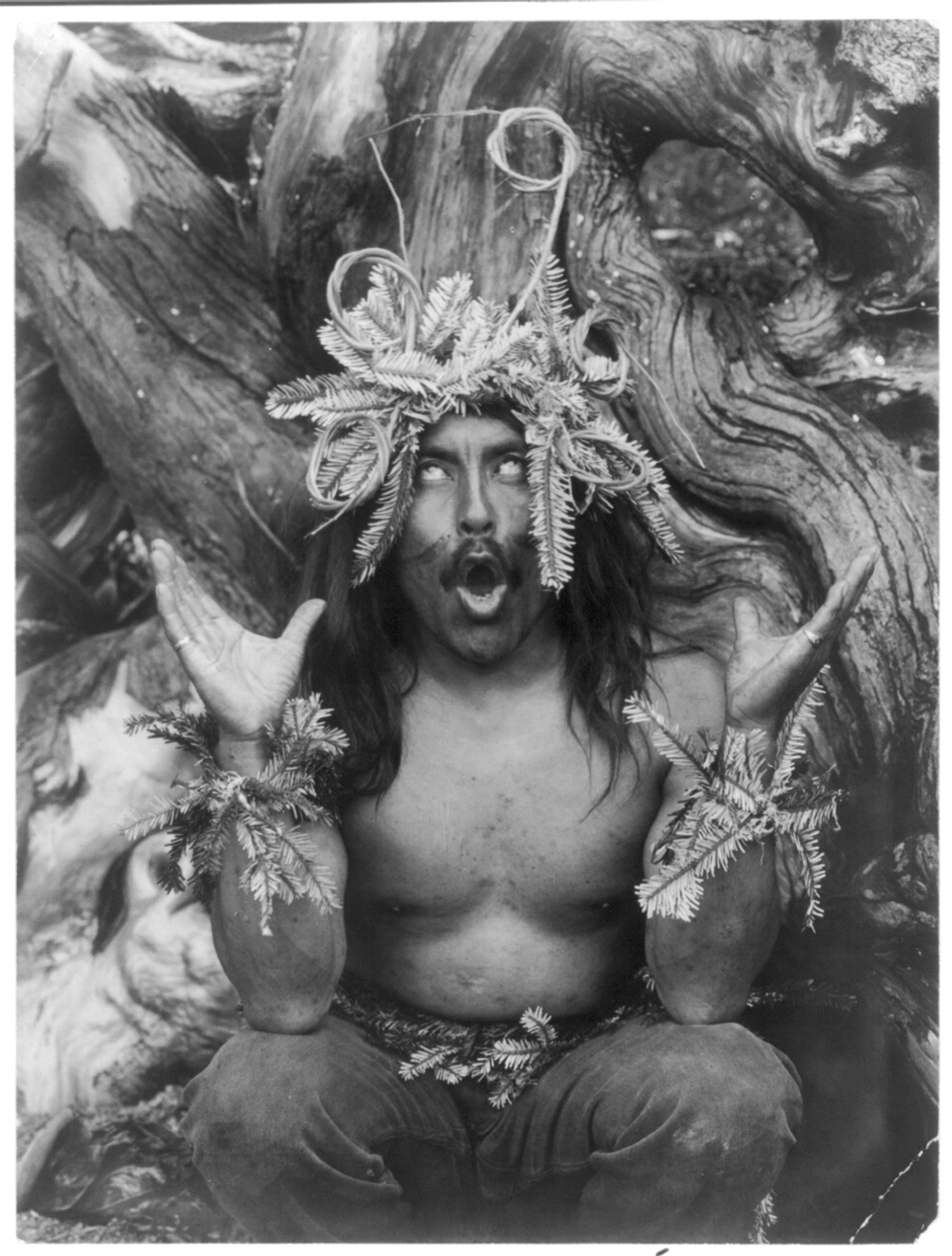
Hamatsa Shaman seated on the ground in front of a tree, facing front, "possessed by supernatural power" after having spent several days in the woods as part of an initiation ritual

In 1951, Mircea Eliade's historical study of different manifestations of shamanism across the globe, titled Shamanism: Archaic Techniques of Ecstasy, was published in France. He pointed out that shamanism was not just practiced in Siberia and Eurasia, but could be found in cultures all across the world. According to Eliade, the core principle of shamanism is the application of techniques of ecstasy which enable people to interact with the spiritual world on behalf of the community.

There are three ways of becoming a shaman: by spontaneous vocation (i.e. the "call" of "election), by hereditary transmission, or by personal quest. A shaman is only recognized after he received two kinds of teaching: ecstatic (e.g. dreams, trances, visions) and traditional (e.g. shamanic techniques, names, and functions of the spirits, mythology, and genealogy of the clan, secret language). The former teaching is conveyed by the spirits while the latter lesson is given by the elder shamans. Together, both teachings constitute initiation.

Selection for the role of a shaman may be derived from a crisis, an illness, or an episode of insanity; all of which are interpreted as experiencing personal death. This initiation crisis usually involves an experience of suffering which is followed by death and dismemberment (i.e. descent into the underworld), an ascent unto the upper world and interactions with other souls and spirits along these both ways (cf. dying-and-rising deity). The cross-culturally recurrent mytheme of death-dismemberment-rebirth reflect the death of one identity and the birth of another one. Overcoming these experiences leads the shaman towards a new level of identity, and this transforming experience is symbolized as the flight of his or her soul.

A shaman's soul-flying abilities presuppose a sacred cosmology, or a world-view that encompasses a sacred or ultimate reality that is structured in what has been called an archetypically, three-storied cosmology. It entails the earth in the middle or the everyday world of non-ordinary reality. The upper world is supposed to be the abode of benevolent spirits and heavenly scenes, while the underworld consists of ancestral and malignant spirits as well as dark and gloomy places.

== Historical overview ==
=== The Stone Age ===
Prior to the first agricultural revolution, when people still lived in hunter-gatherer societies, shamanism possibly emerged from a belief in the afterlife. Shamanism was practiced among nearly all documented hunter-gatherers, and it has often been proposed by anthropologists to be the world's oldest profession. By visibly transforming during initiation and trance, the shaman attempts to convince tribal members that he or she can interact with invisible forces that control uncertain outcomes. By doing so, the shaman acts like he or she can influence unpredictable, important events. The transformative display of the shaman during trance is thought to be essential because it serves as evidence of spiritual communication for those who behold his or her ritual, which then contributes to the credibility of the shaman.

=== The Bronze Age ===
After gradually switching towards an agrarian society, humans settled down and civilization emerged. During the Bronze Age, it is thought that people experienced themselves in what has been called a "continuous cosmos", wherein a sense of deep connectedness existed between the natural plus socio-cultural world and the worlds of the Gods (above and below). In such a world, time moves in cycles that repeat itself throughout eternity. In a continuous cosmos, people defined themselves in terms of fitting into and being in harmony with, these cycles. Back then, wisdom is thought to be power-oriented: to become a wise Bronze Age man or woman meant to learn how to acquire and hold on to power. For example, the Pharaoh was thought of as godlike, and this was not a metaphor for the Ancient Egyptians. The difference between human beings and the Gods was essentially differences in power.

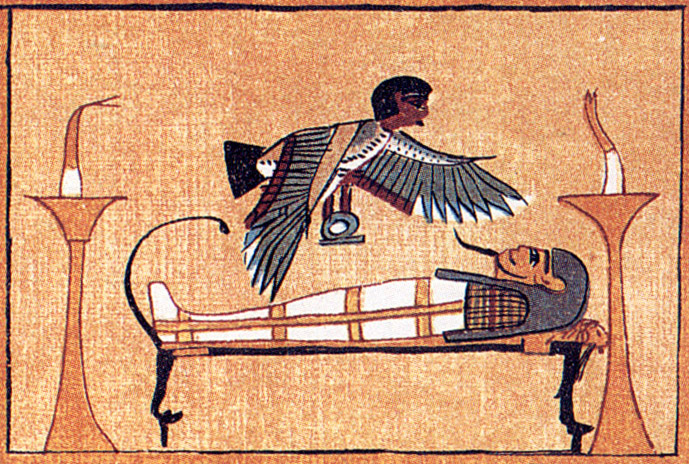
Facsimile of a vignette from the Book of the Dead. The ba of the deceased Theban scribe Ani hovers over his mummy as it lies on a bier

The Ancient Egyptians believed that an individual was made up of many parts, some physical and others spiritual. Their concept of the soul postulated several components, one of which – the Ba - corresponds with what in Western thought is called the soul, although the two concepts are not easily commensurable. In the Egyptian Book of the Dead, the Ba is depicted as a bird with the head of a human, symbolizing both its human nature and its mobility. It was believed that the Ba lived on after the body had died, and flew out of the tomb of his or her owner to join with the Ka ("life force", cf. élan vital) in the afterlife, and it was conceivable that the Ba could also be released during sleep. Later, Coptic texts adopted the Greek word Psyche instead of the native Bai as the term for soul, which demonstrates a link between the earlier concept of the Ba and the Christian interpretation of the soul.

=== Classical Antiquity ===
The worldview of a continuous cosmos is shattered during the Axial Age, although it does not vanish completely. Charles Taylor dubbed this transition "the Great Disembedding": the world as a continuous cosmos, in a mythological sense, was broadly replaced by a different worldview on understanding the relationship between the self and the world. This new worldview uses the mythology of two worlds, namely "the everyday world" and "the real world". The everyday world is populated with untrained minds and riddled with self-deception, violence, and chaos. In contrast, in the real world you are in touch with reality, wherein wise minds can see the world without illusion and delusion.

During the Axial Age, the practice of soul flight was exapted by ancient philosophers, meaning that it came to be used as a means of transcending the self from the everyday world towards the real world. Meaning is not based on the connectedness with the eternal cycles anymore; its focus has shifted towards a connectedness with the real world. As such, there was a radical change in how people defined themselves and the world around them, as people increasingly defined themselves by how they can self-transcend, or how they can grow as an individual. Wisdom changed from being solely focused on power towards a focus on this quest for self-transcendence.

==== Orphism ====
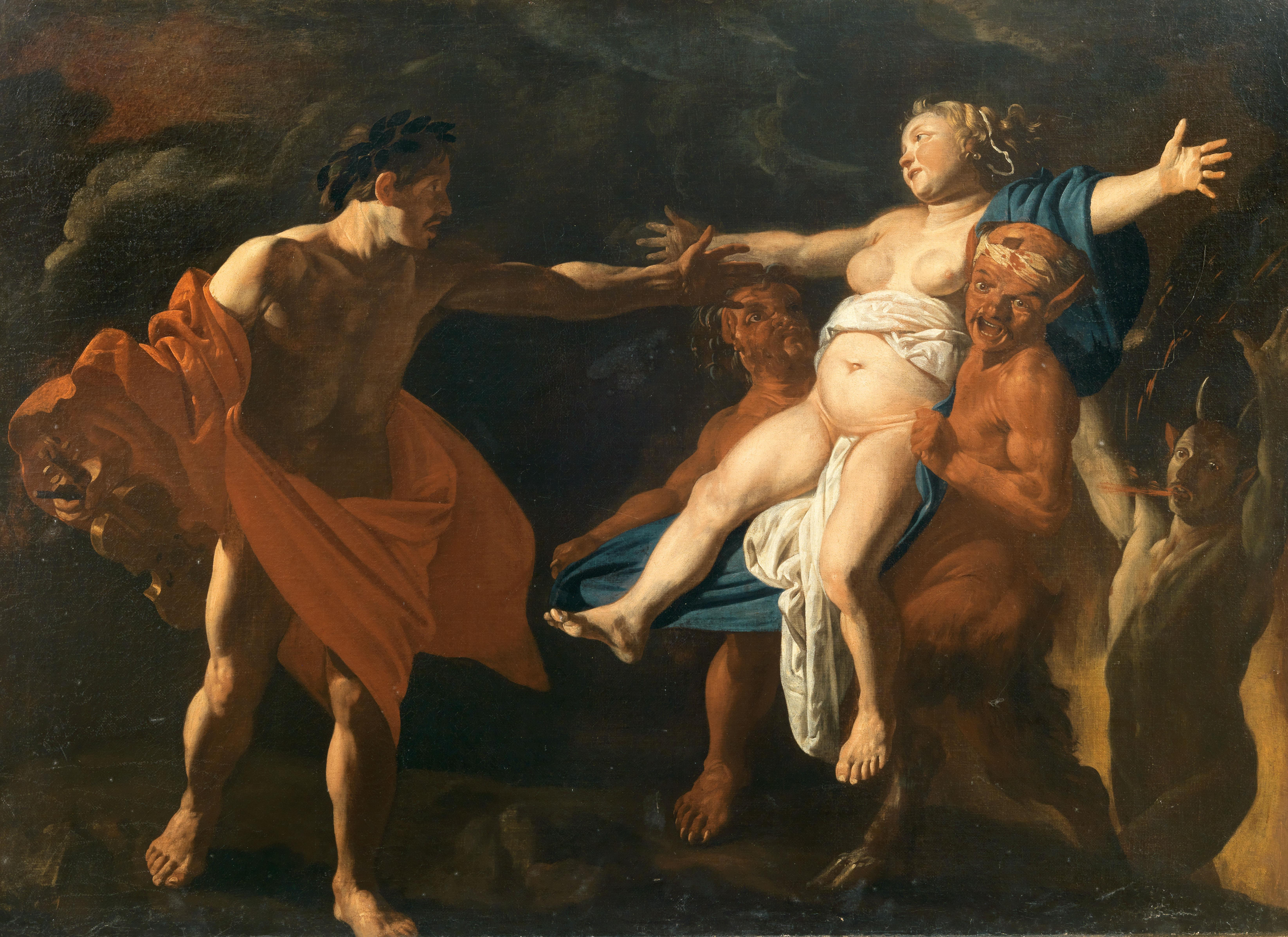
Orpheus and Eurydice (Dutch School, 17th Century, artist unknown)

Orpheus, the legendary musician and prophet from Greek mythology, was believed to have descended into Hades to recover his lost wife Eurydice. Alas to no avail, but, allegedly, he lived to tell his tale as he did return to back the earthly world. Orpheus was seen as the founder and prophet of the Orphic Mysteries, possibly the successor of the more ancient Dionysian Mysteries. According to the Orphics, the soul is godlike in its essential nature but, due to some primordial sin, it descended to earth where it lives in a succession of bodies, human or otherwise. The soul of man is divine and immortal and it seeks to return to its essential nature, but the body holds it in its captivity. At the moment of bodily death, the soul is liberated for a short time before it is again taken captive in a different body. As such, the soul journeys between the natural world and the spiritual world from one generation to the next (cf. reincarnation). To escape this so-called "circle of necessity", or "wheel of birth", an act of divine grace is required. The more virtuous one lives her or his life, the higher will be their next reincarnation until the soul ascends as high as from which it came (cf. Metempsychosis).

==== Pythagoreanism ====
The Pythagoreans adopted many of the Orphic teachings into their own philosophical tradition, in which great emphasis was also laid on the purification of the soul. According to Proclus, Pythagoras learned Orphic beliefs and practices when he completed initiation in Thrace. Pythagoras is considered by some scholars to be a reformer of Orphism, just as Orpheus was a reformer of the Dionysian Mysteries. As such, he was in part responsible for introducing the mystical element into Ancient Greek philosophy.

It is plausible that Pythagoras was initiated into shamanic training through something which was called the "Thunderstone ceremony", which involved isolating oneself in a cave and going through some sort of radical transformation before coming back out of it. Pythagoras also seems to have experienced soul flight, when he spoke about the ability of the psyche to be liberated from the body. By using music and mathematics, he realized there are abstract patterns that lie beyond our direct awareness, but that we can get access to nonetheless. Self-transcendence, in this case, means getting in touch with these rationally realized patterns. Although we are trapped inside the everyday world we can, in a mythological sense, learn to fly above this world and see the real world. Here, myths refer to symbolic stories about those patterns that have always been with us.

==== Plotinus ====
In Plotinus' treatise on the nature of beauty, the beauty of the soul consists in the emancipation from the passions. The neoplatonic philosopher argued that those who have the strength should turn away from material beauty, forego all that is known by the eyes, and search for their soul's beauty within themselves. We should aspire to behold the vision of our inner beauty, so our soul can first become virtuous and beautiful and, eventually, divine.

Plotinus further asked in what manner, or by what device, one may achieve such an inner vision. Referring to a passage from Homer's Odyssey ("Let us flee, then, to our beloved homeland"), Plotinus inquires into the manner of this flight:

"This is not a journey for the feet; the feet bring us only from land to land; nor need you think of coach or ship to carry you away; all this order of things you must set aside and refuse to see: you must close the eyes and call instead upon another vision which is to be waked within you, a vision, the birthright of all, which few turn to use".

=== The Middle Ages ===
With its establishment as the dominant religion in Europe, Christianity and its doctrines became of the utmost importance in the Middle Ages.

A passage in the eighth book of the Confessions, Saint Augustine discusses the flight of the soul in a way that resembles Plotinus' treatise. Both concur that one must dispense with ordinary modes of perception to experience soul flight. Saint Augustine interprets the soul's flight as one's way of reaching wisdom which is the way directed towards the light; we have to flee from sensible things and have need of wings to fly towards that light, out of the darkness in which we live. But where the problem for Plotinus is one of seeing, St. Augustine emphasizes the importance of the will, and he replaces feeling good or beautiful with willing it. His conceptualization of soul flight became, especially in his later works, thus more concerned with one's willingness to make the journey towards Heaven.

The opposite direction is taken in the Apocalypse of Peter, which describes Christ's three days' descent into Hell. Another example of this kind of Christian katabasis is the Harrowing of Hell, which also chronicles the period between Jesus' Crucifixion and his Resurrection. These are one of the earliest examples of explicit depictions of heaven and hell, a theme that would inspire many more writers and artists in days to come.

The Imitation of Christ, which is the practice of following the example of Jesus, is considered to be the fundamental purpose of Christian life by Saint Augustine. In the words of Francis of Assisi, poverty is the key element of following the example of Jesus and he believed in the physical as well as the spiritual imitation of Christ. His physical imitation was achieved when Saint Francis received stigmata in 1224 A.D., during the apparition of a Seraph in a state of religious ecstasy. In the early 15th century, Thomas à Kempis wrote the Imitation of Christ, which provides specific instructions for imitating Christ. His devotional approach is characterized by its emphasis on the interior life as well as the withdrawal from this world, thus it is most concerned with the spiritual imitation of Christ.

==== Dante ====
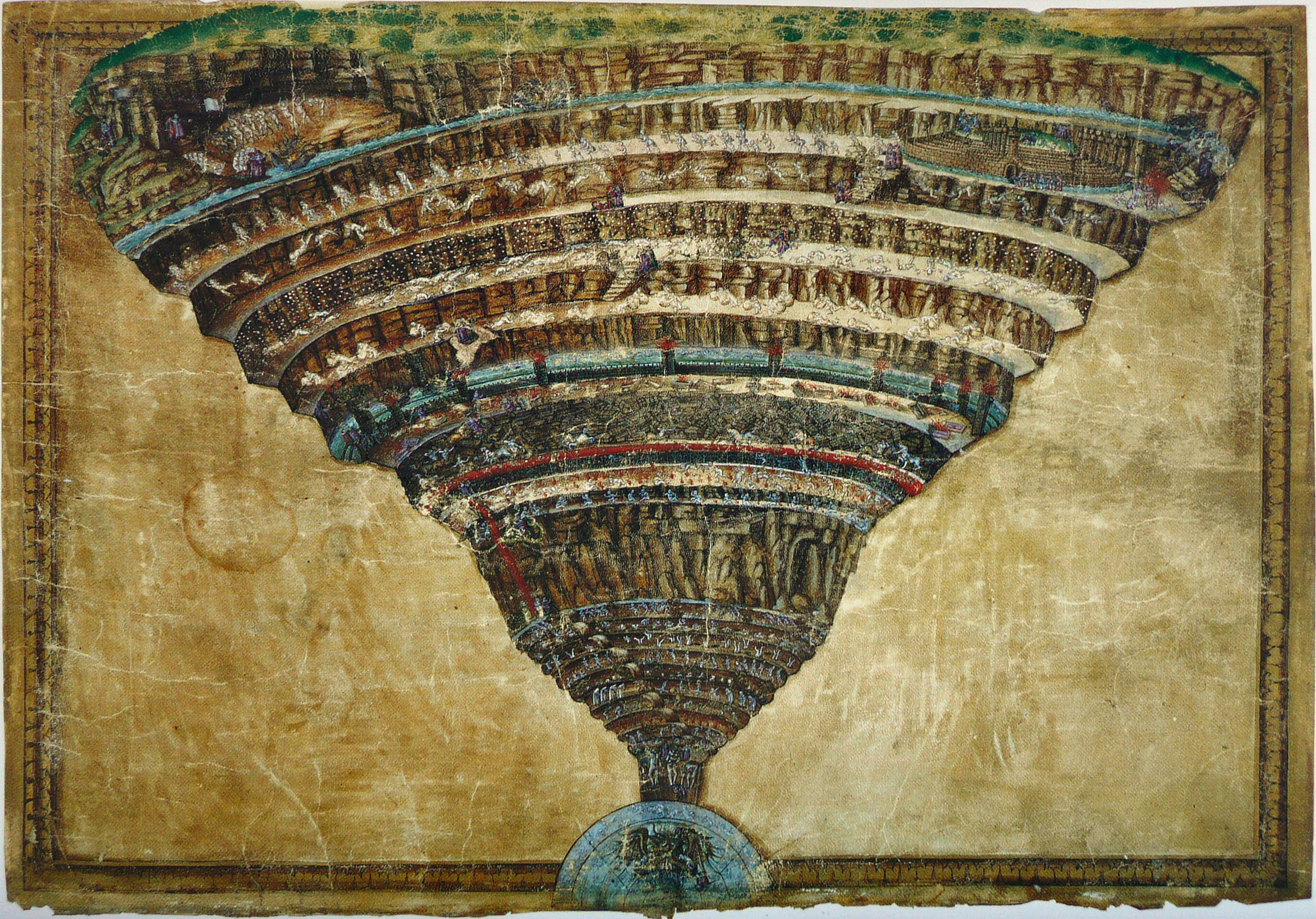
Sandro Botticelli's Chart of Hell

Dante's Divine Comedy, one of the most celebrated works in Western literature, narrates the journey of the soul after death. It chronicles Dante's own descent into Hell, his wanderings in Purgatory, and finally, his soul's ascent to Heaven. In accordance with the medieval world-view of 14th century Europe, the poet envisions a rich afterlife where he, accompanied by one of three guides, visits many mysterious places and encounters numerous souls, spirits, and shadows. In an allegorical sense, the poem represents the soul's flight from Lucifer in Hell towards God in Heaven.

With regard to the Commedia, Carl Jung argued:

"The compelling power and deeper meaning of the work do[es] not lie in the historical and mythical material, but in the visionary experience it serves to express".

==== Meister Eckhart ====
Around the same time when Dante was compiling his Commedia, Meister Eckhart commented the following on where one must look to find spiritual salvation:

"[To] grasp all things in a divine way and make of them something more than they are in themselves. (...) This cannot be learned by taking flight, that is by fleeing from things and physically withdrawing to a place of solitude, but rather we must learn to maintain inner solitude regardless of where we are or who we are with. We must learn to break through things and to grasp God in them, allowing him to take form in us powerfully and essentially".

According to Meister Eckhardt the way toward the soul lies inwards, as he writes:

"Therefore do I turn back once more to myself, there do I find the deepest places, deeper than Hell itself; for even from there does my wretchedness drive me. Nowhere can I escape myself! Here I will set me down and here I will remain".

=== The Modern Age ===
During the Renaissance, Europeans refocused their attention on the ideas and achievements of classical antiquity, which became particularly manifested in art, architecture, politics, science, and literature. The invention of the printing press instigated a new age of mass communication, with the result that the flow of ideas between people reached unprecedented levels of speed and range. This permanently altered the structure of society exemplified, among other things, by a sharp increase in literacy and the emergence of the middle class. Certain authors began to use writing as a means to express their visionary experiences, a practice which became more widespread from the Middle Ages onwards.

==== Milton ====
In 17th century Britain, during a time of religious and political turmoil, John Milton wrote Paradise Lost. The epic poem, written in blank verse, starts in medias res with Satan's rebellion against God, seen through the eyes of Satan himself. It continues with Satan's fall from Heaven, the arrival of the serpent in Eden, and eventually, the story of Adam and Eve. The overall theme of Milton's masterpiece addresses the battle between God and Satan, fought across three worlds (i.e. Heaven, Earth, and Hell), for control over the human soul.

==== Swedenborg ====
In the 1740s, Emanuel Swedenborg began to experience strange dreams and visions which he documented in his travelogue. These experiences culminated in a spiritual awakening, in which he received a revelation from Jesus. Because God had opened his spiritual eyes, Swedenborg felt he could visit heaven and hell to communicate with angels, demons, and other spirits. In arguably his most famous work, Heaven and Hell, he gives a detailed description of the afterlife and explains how souls live on after the physical death of one's body. According to Swedenborg, instead of one hell that is similar for everybody, there are an infinite variety and diversity of Heavens and Hells. His writings gave rise to a new religious movement known as the New Church, which promoted one universal church based on love and charity.

==== Blake ====
Between 1790 and 1793, while the Revolution was gaining momentum in France, William Blake composed a book in a similar literary tradition about the visionary's practice of soul flight. Like Dante in his Commedia and Milton in his Paradise lost, the poet visits Hell and Heaven where he meets and speaks with angels and demons. The book was written in prose, except for the introductory "Argument" and the "Song of Liberty", and accompanied by paintings of his own dreams and visions. With satirical reference to Swedenborg's Heaven and Hell, he titled this book the Marriage of Heaven and Hell. Although Blake was greatly influenced by Swedenborg's mystical conception of a sacred cosmology, he was opposed to Swedenborg's dualistic interpretation of good and evil. As such, he deliberately presented a more unified vision of the cosmos wherein the upper world and the underworld are both parts of the same divine order; i.e. the marriage of Heaven and Hell.

==== Carl Jung ====
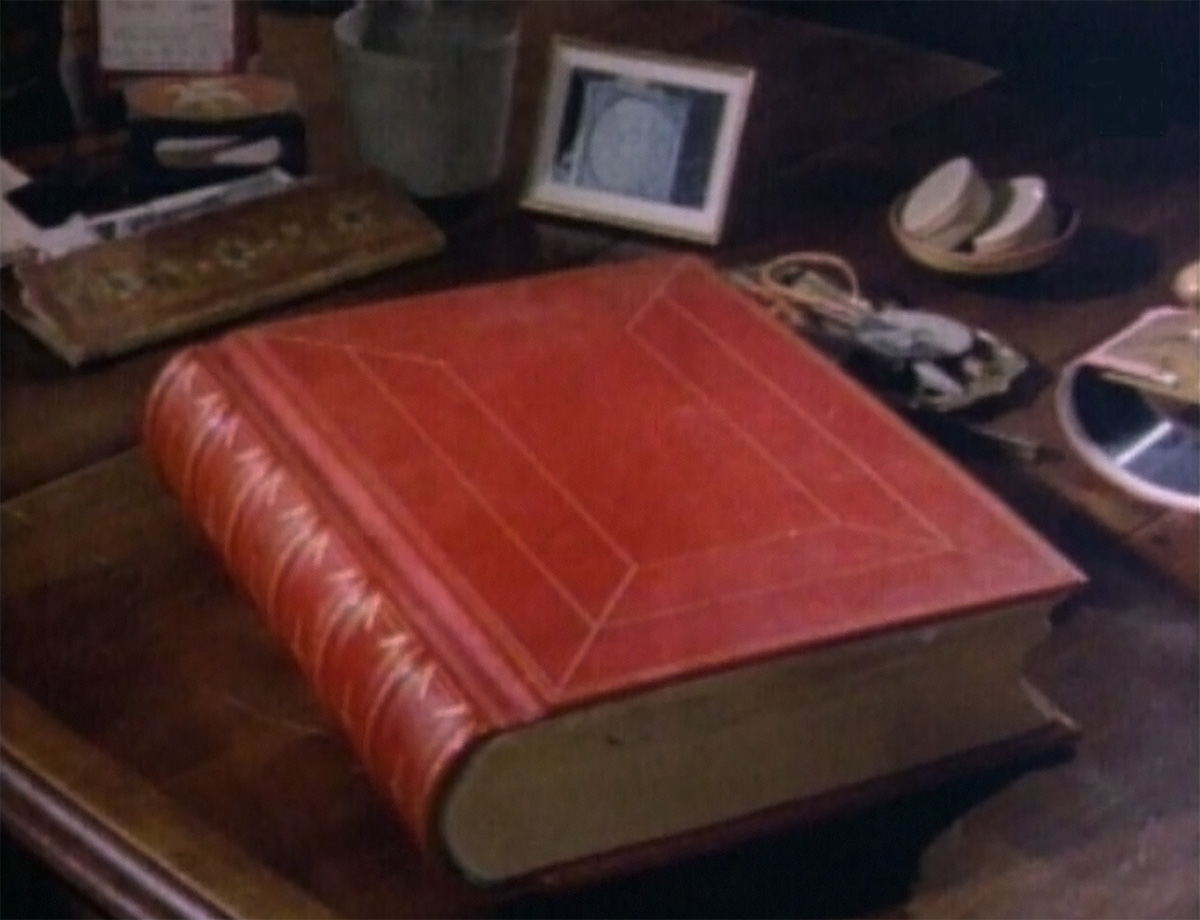
The Red Book resting on Jung's office desk

From 1913 until 1930, Carl Jung carried out a self-experiment that became known as his confrontation with the unconscious. He first recorded his inner experiences (dreams, visions, fantasies) in the Black Books, which are basically the records of this self-experiment. These records were revised by Jung, and reflections were added. He then copied these revisions and reflections in a calligraphic script and, accompanied by his own paintings (not unlike Blake in his prophetic books), put it together into a book bound in red leather entitled Liber Novus ("New Book"). The Red Book, as it is popularly known, was published in October 2009 and it chronicles Jung's struggle to regain his soul and overcome the contemporary malaise of spiritual alienation.

Within the same context of the visionary tradition in Western literature of some of the aforementioned authors, Jung argued that before you can find the way toward spiritual fulfillment you first must descend into your own Hell. In the Red book, Jung comments the following on Jesus' descent into Hell:

"No one knows what happened during the three days Christ was in Hell. I have experienced it. The men of yore said he had preached to the deceased. What they say is true, but do you know how this happened? It was folly and monkey business, an atrocious Hell's masquerade of the holiest mysteries. How else could Christ have saved his Antichrist? Read the unknown books of the ancients, and you will learn much from them. Notice that Christ did not remain in Hell, but rose to the heights in the beyond".

On the dynamic relationship between Heaven and Hell, Jung concludes:

"But the deepest Hell is when you realize that Hell is also no Hell, but a cheerful Heaven, not a Heaven in itself, but in this respect a Heaven, and in that respect a Hell"

== See also ==
- Afterlife
- Altered state of consciousness
- Body of light
- Christian mysticism
- Dreams
- Ecstasy
- Imagination
- Mystery religions
- Mysticism
- Numinous
- Religious ecstasy
- Religious experience
- Self-transcendence
- Shamanism
- Soul
- Spiritualism
- Spiritual practice
- Trance
- Vision (spirituality)

== Images ==
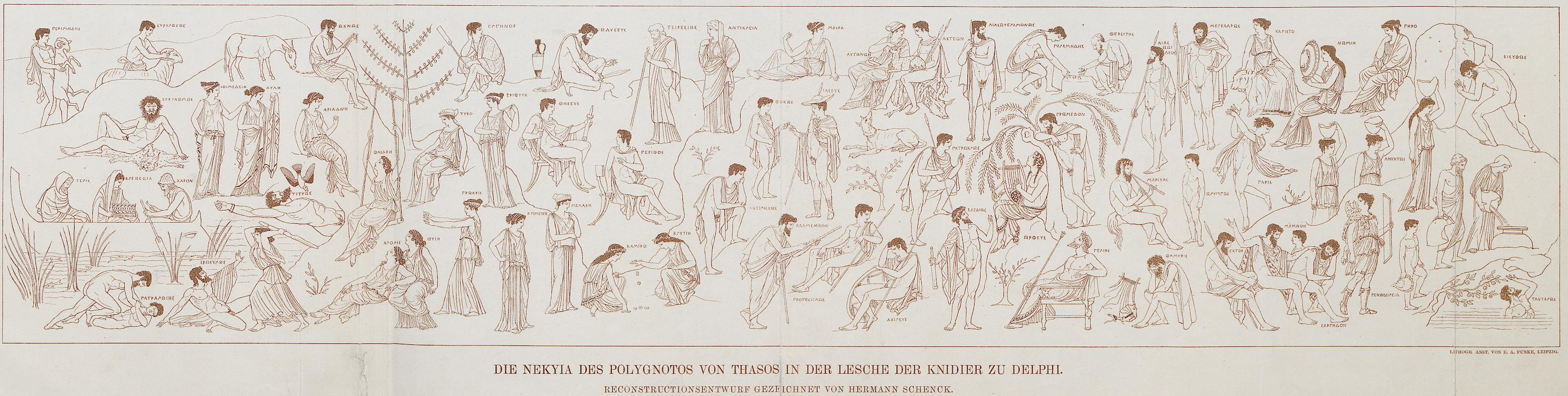
Reconstruction of Nekyia by Polygnotus

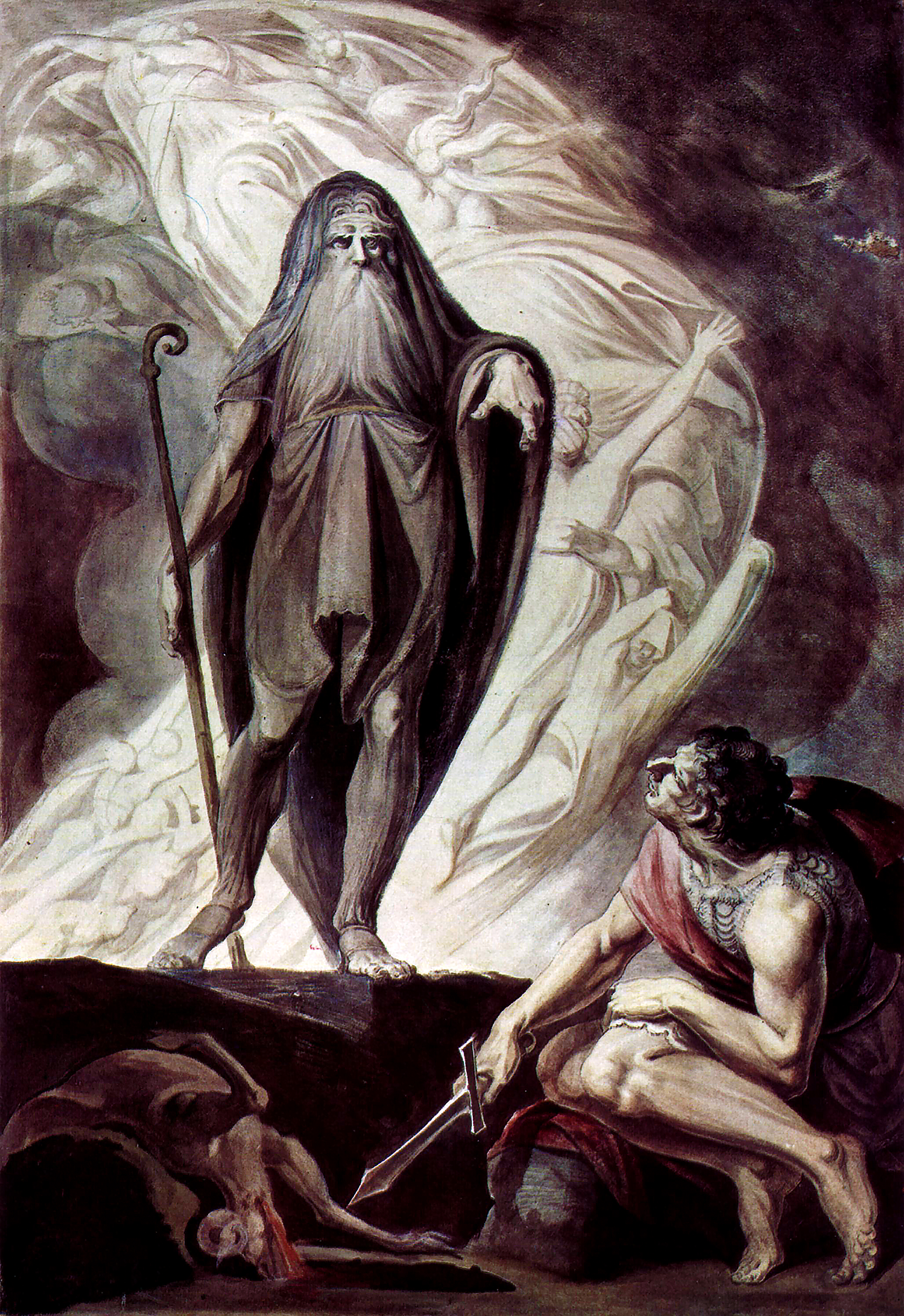
Tiresias appears to Ulysses during the sacrifice, by Henry Fuseli

The Garden of Earthly Delights by Hieronymus Bosch. The left panel depicts a scene of paradise from the Garden of Eden, the middle panel artistically resembles Life on earth, and the right panel illustrates Hell.

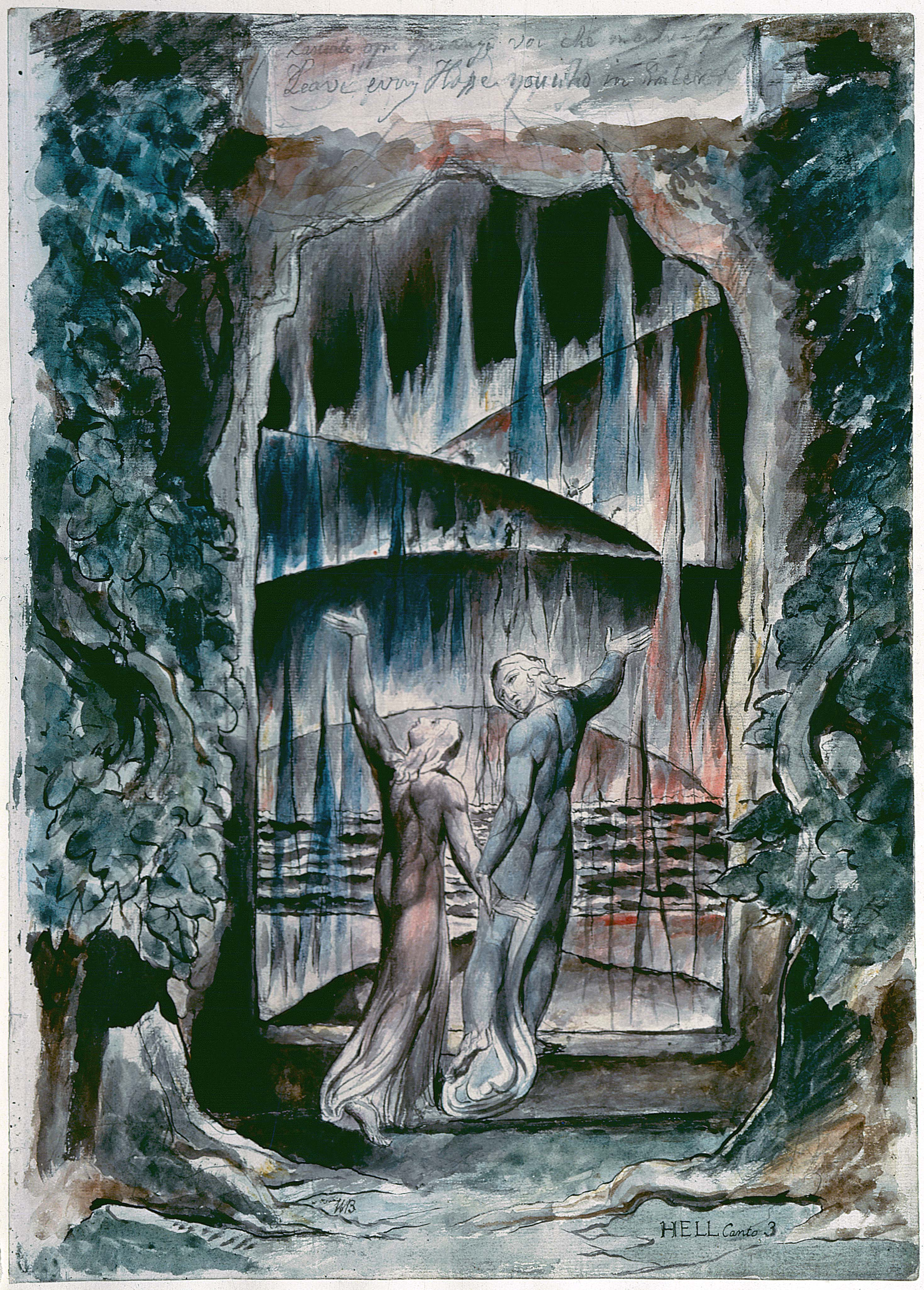
Illustrations to Dante Alighieri's Divine Comedy by William Blake, depicting the Inscription over Hell-Gate

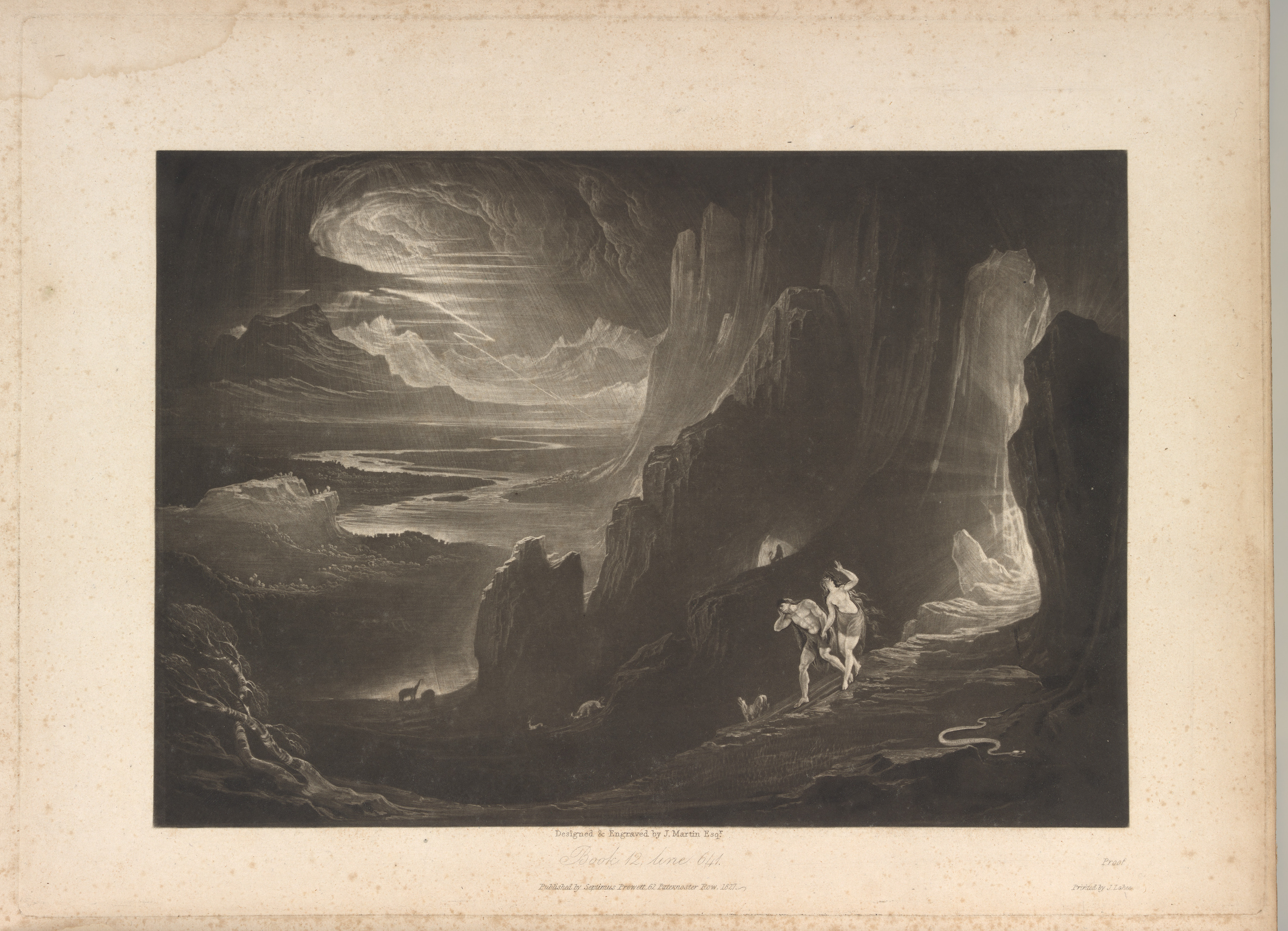
Paradise Lost by John Milton with Illustrations by John Martin

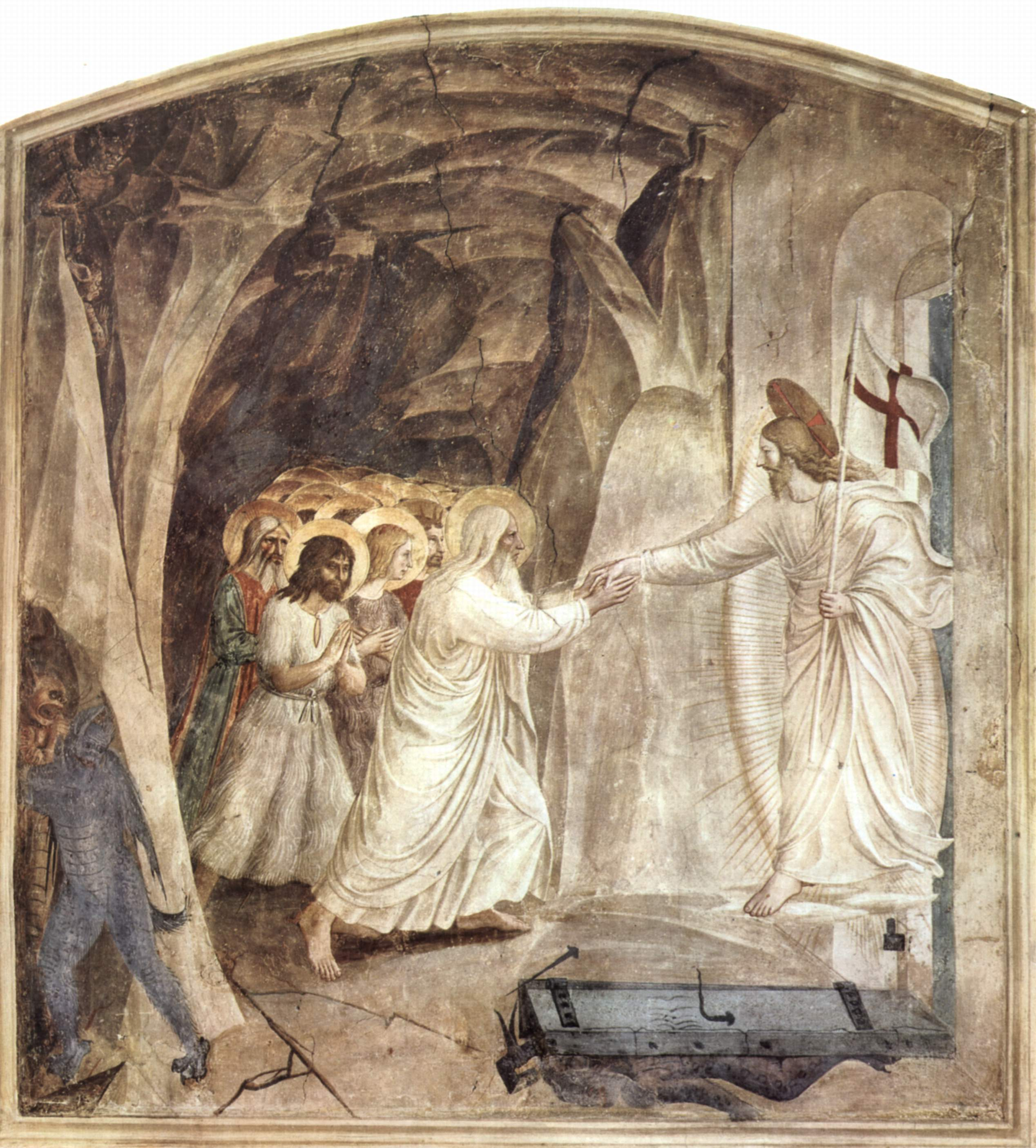
Before his Resurrection, Jesus grants salvation to souls by the Harrowing of Hell. Fresco, by Fra Angelico
