= Seven Sermons to the Dead =

1916 collection of texts by C. G. Jung

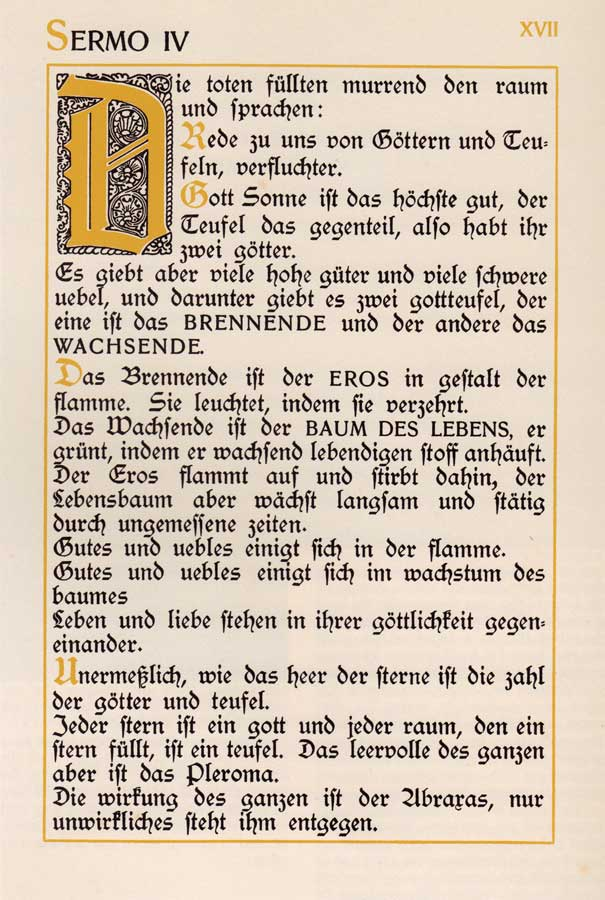
- A page from C. G. Jung's 1916 private printing of the Septem Sermones ad Mortuos
- Editor: Sonu Shamdasani
- Author: Carl Jung (under pseudonym Basilides)
- Series: The Red Book
- Published: 1916 (private)
- Publication date: 2009

Seven Sermons to the Dead (Latin: Septem Sermones ad Mortuos) is a collection of seven mystical or "Gnostic" texts written and privately published by C. G. Jung in 1916, under the title Seven Sermons to the Dead, written by Basilides of Alexandria, the city where East and West meet.

Jung did not identify himself as the author of the publication and instead ascribed it to the early Christian Gnostic religious teacher, Basilides. Seven Sermons is a part of Jung's Red Book and can be described as its "summary revelation." Seven Sermons is the only portion of the material contained in The Red Book manuscripts that Jung shared privately during his lifetime. The Red Book was published posthumously in October 2009. The introduction and notes to the text of The Red Book, by Sonu Shamdasani, provide previously unavailable primary documentation on this important period of Jung's life.

== History ==
In November 1913, after his break with his one time colleague, Sigmund Freud, Jung began a personal exploration of the psyche. He called it his "confrontation with the unconscious", meaning he wilfully entered imaginative or "visionary" states of consciousness. The practice continued intensively from the end of 1913 until about 1917 and then abated by around 1923. Jung carefully recorded his journey of the imagination in six black-covered personal journals (the "Black Books"). They provide a dated chronological ledger recording visions and dialogues with his soul.

Beginning in late 1914, Jung started to transcribe and illustrate, in manuscript, material from the Black Book journals into his Red Book, the folio-sized leather-bound illuminated volume he created as a formal record of his journey. Jung repeatedly stated that the visions and imaginative experiences recorded in the Red Book formed the nucleus of all his later works.

Jung kept the Red Book private during his lifetime, allowing only a few family members and associates to read from it. The only part of this visionary material he chose to release in limited circulation was the Seven Sermons, which he had privately printed in 1916. Throughout his life Jung occasionally gave copies of this small book to friends and students, but it was available only as a gift from Jung himself and never offered for public sale or distribution. When Jung's biographical memoir, Memories, Dreams, Reflections, was published in 1962, Seven Sermons to the Dead was included in an appendix.

It remained unclear until recently exactly how Seven Sermons related to the contents of the hidden Red Book. After Jung's death in 1961, all public access to the Red Book was denied by his heirs. Finally in October 2009, nearly 50 years after his death, the Jung family relented and released the Red Book for publication as a facsimile, to be edited by professor Sonu Shamdasani. Publication revealed that the Seven Sermons to the Dead was actually the closing pages of the Red Book. The version transcribed in the Red Book varies only slightly from the text printed in 1916. The difference is that the Red Book version includes an additional amplifying homily by Philemon (Jung's spirit guide) after each of the sermons. [The Red Book: Liber Novus, pp. 346–54]

The gnostic author of a commentary on the Sermons, Stephan A. Hoeller, subsequently asked the editor of The Red Book, Sonu Shamdasani, to comment on the relationship between the two books, to which he replied that the Seven Sermons was like an island, whereas the Red Book was like a vast continent.
