= Haddon Kime =

American film composer

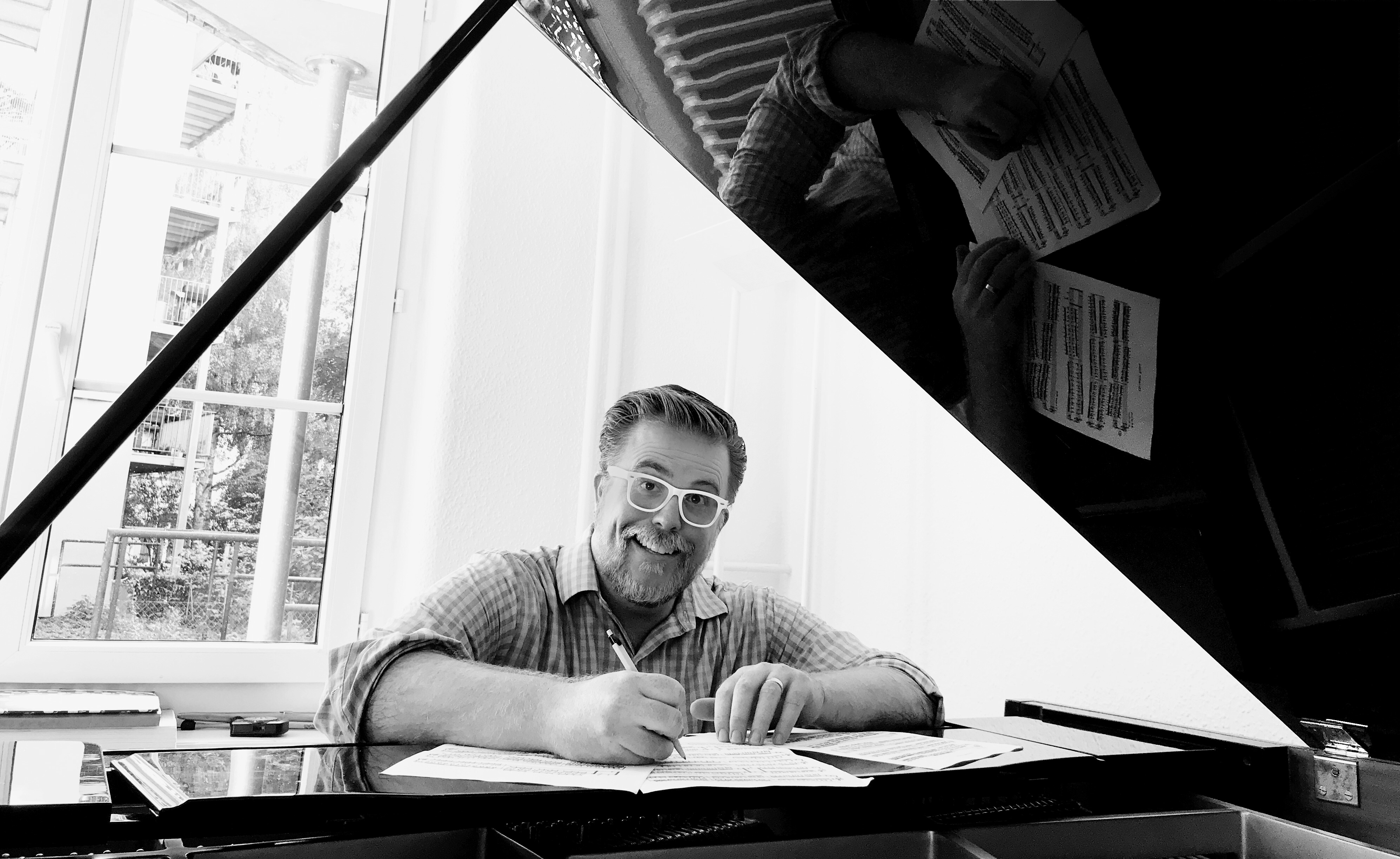
- Born: Haddon Kime; June 28, 1976 (age 49); Pinetop, Arizona, U.S.
- Other name: Haddon Givens Kime
- Occupations: Composer, lyricist, writer, director

Haddon Kime (born June 28, 1976) is an American theatre and film composer, lyricist, sound designer, and director. Early in his career, Kime frequent collaborated in the theatre scenes of Boston and New York City writing music and sound designs for plays and musicals produced by New Repertory Theatre, Boston Playwrights Theatre, Gloucester Stage and Speakeasy Stage among others. He currently lives and works in Atlanta, and is credited with inventing the zoomsical during the COVID-19 pandemic of 2020.

== Career ==
In 2013 he wrote the music and co-wrote the lyrics (with Rick Lombardo and Kirsten Brandt) for the 2014 rock musical adaptation of Hans Christian Andersen's "The Snow Queen." The musical opened to previews at San Jose Repertory Theatre on November 19, 2013 the same day as the Disney film "Frozen (2013 film)" which is based on the same source material. After a successful month long run, the musical earned a slot at the 2014 New York Musical Theatre Festival, where in addition to positive critical reviews, it won the Steele Spring Stage Rights Publishing Award as well as the award for Excellence in Overall Design, which Kime shared with co-sound designer Rick Lombardo, costume designer Frances Nelson McSherry and lighting/projection designer David Lee Cuthbert.

In 2015, Kime led an artistic team in Atlanta in writing an experimental and immersive musical adaptation of The Red Book (Jung) by Carl Jung. The project was awarded a Reiser Artists Lab grant from the Alliance Theatre where a workshop production of the first 45 minutes of the show was produced in 2016.

In 2017, Kime collaborated with playwright and improv comic Travis Sharp and Dad's Garage Theatre Company on a parody musical entitled "Wicket: A Parody Musical," a comic satire of the film Return of the Jedi that, like the Broadway musical Wicked (musical), is a popular story told from the perspective of a different character, in this case the Ewok who is first to meet Princess Leia. "Wicket: A Parody Musical" was subsequently produced and performed in San Antonio, where it won the 2019 Regional Award for Best Musical from Broadway World. In 2023, "Wicket: A Parody Musical" was produced in Buffalo, NY to critical acclaim.

In May 2020, Kime is credited with creating a new artform, the zoomsical, when, in conjunction with Out of Hand Theater Company in Atlanta, he released an original 10-minute-musical comedy about a self-care class that makes the move online during the Social distancing measures related to the COVID-19 pandemic. Kime wrote the book, music and lyrics as well as directed. Since the musical was conceived and written for, and rehearsed and performed on Zoom Video Communications software, Kime titled the production "LAG: A Zoomsical" after thinking of the term "zoomsical" while on a walk with his dog.

“Lag is a metaphor for not just the technical glitches that sometimes happen with this video conferencing software, but also because our lives our lagging a little bit. Our bank accounts are lagging. Our plans are lagging. Our vacations are lagging. My child’s education is lagging. So there’s a lag going on and instead of calling it a musical since it’s on Zoom, we called it a Zoomsical,”

— Haddon Kime, Out Of Hand Theatre Creates An Original Musical On Zoom, WABE

"LAG: A Zoomsical" was subsequently re-titled "LAG: A Zoomsical Comedy", and is published by composer Roger Bean's Stage Rights Publishing Company. In October 2020, LAG was recognized by American Express Essentials Magazine on their list of "19 Unmissable Online Theatre Experiences" alongside online productions by The Wooster Group, The Metropolitan Opera, and Abbey Theatre, Dublin. In 2022, LAG was featured as a digital offering in the 2022 Edinburgh Festival Fringe.

== Education ==
Kime attended and graduated Berklee College of Music with a degree in film scoring

== Awards ==
- 2015 Reiser Atlanta Artists Lab (Lead Artist) Recipient
- 2015 Best Original Music - San Francisco Bay Area Theatre Critics Circle for "Game On"
- 2014 New York Musical Festival, Excellence in Overall Design (shared award)
- 2012 Honorable Mention, International Songwriting Competition (Lyrics Only Category) for song "Colorado Creek"
- 2008 Tanne Foundation Award for Outstanding Achievement in the Arts
- 2007 Best Sound Design - Independent Reviewers of New England (IRNE Awards) for "A Streetcar Named Desire" at New Repertory Theatre
- 2004 Best Sound Design - Independent Reviewers of New England (IRNE Awards) for "A Girls War" at New Repertory Theatre and "Haymarket" at Boston Playwright's Theatre
