= San Jose Repertory Theatre =

First resident professional theatre company in San Jose, California, USA

Susan and Phil Hammer Theatre Center
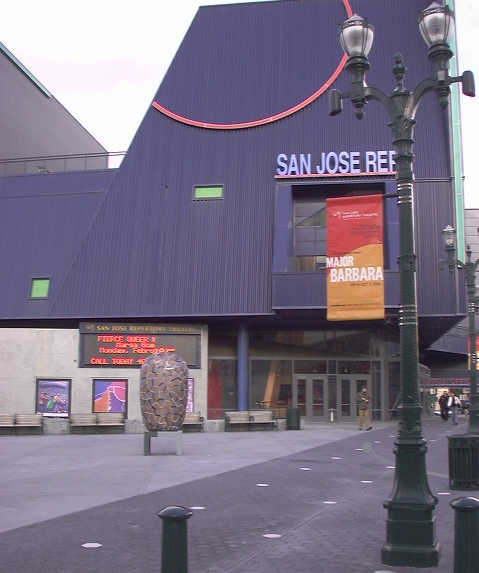
- Former home of San Jose Repertory
- Interactive map of Susan and Phil Hammer Theatre Center
- Address: 101 Paseo de San Antonio; San Jose, California; United States
- Capacity: 584
- Type: regional theatre

Construction
- Opened: 1980 (company); 1997 (building)
- Closed: June 2014

The San Jose Repertory Theatre (a.k.a. San Jose Rep) was the first resident professional theatre company in San Jose, California. It was founded in 1980 by James P. Reber. In 2008, after the demise of the American Musical Theatre of San Jose, the San Jose Rep became the largest non-profit, professional theatre company in the South Bay with an annual operating budget of $5 million. In 2006, it was saved from impending insolvency by a $2 million bailout loan from the city of San Jose; this was later restructured into a long-term loan similar to a mortgage.

On June 11, 2014, San Jose Rep ceased operations and filed Chapter 7 bankruptcy. The building was reopened in 2015 as the Hammer Theatre, now operated by San Jose State University.

== History ==
=== The early years ===
San Jose Rep was founded by James P. Reber in 1980 (originally as San Jose Repertory Company). James Reber was born in Butte, Montana, and was raised in the Santa Clara Valley. He returned home after having been the first employee of the Berkeley Shakespeare Festival (now California Shakespeare Theatre in Orinda, California) as business manager and general manager.

San Jose Rep was formed as San Jose's first resident professional theatre (originally called San Jose Repertory Company), the Rep soon became the fastest growing regional theatre in the country. Mr. Reber led a group of young artists, technical staff, and administrative staff, most of them based in the Bay Area. The Rep's opening production of Noël Coward's Private Lives was the first step for the fledgling company. This was followed by three more plays in 1981 (including one directed by Tony Taccone before he was artistic director at Berkeley Rep).

Early support came from the City of San Jose's Fine Arts Commission, which provided funding and worked to help create a viable board of trustees. The first board was led by Dr. Clayton Feldman, who was able to provide guidance for the young staff and helped recruit the future leadership of the Rep, including Attorney Phil Hammer, who succeeded Dr. Feldman. The William and Flora Hewlett Foundation provided a key early grant to help hire professional staff. Elaine Knoernschild joined the board in 1982 and became the third board president. As happens with most nonprofit theatres, the founding board members made success possible by their dedication and hard work.

Most notable among the Rep's early accomplishments was their payment of competitive wages, a commitment that Mr. Reber made for the company from its inception. David Lemos, a recent graduate of Santa Clara University, became the first production manager and eventually artistic director. Lemos and Reber negotiated with Actors Equity for early concessions and eventually to full Equity (Actors' Union) status. Artistically, San Jose Rep was a bit uneven, but given its age, many productions were high quality and were given excellent critical notices and are still revered by patrons.

Among the more distinguished productions of the early Rep era were:

- A popular WWII version of Shakespeare's The Taming of the Shrew directed by Anne McNaughton and featuring a handsome young John Callahan, who later went on to a successful television career, as Petruchio, and Charles Martinet, who would go on to parlay his performance into a long and successful career at Nintendo, as Gremio.
- A series of large productions done in collaboration with the San Jose Symphony, sponsored by Merrill Lynch and known as the Merrill Lynch Great Performances. These were produced in the massive San Jose Center for Performing Arts and had short runs. The first was The Tempest with music by Sibelius and the next was the only known production of Peter Shaffer's masterpiece, Amadeus, featuring Ray Birk as Salieri and a chorus of Opera San Jose singers performing Mozart's Requiem. The music for both productions was conducted by George Cleave.
- A collaborative production of Emily Mann's Execution of Justice, which told the story of the infamous slaying of San Francisco Supervisor Harvey Milk and Mayor George Moscone by Supervisor Dan White. The production was produced by San Jose Rep, Berkeley Repertory Theatre, and the Eureka Theatre. It premiered at the Montgomery Theater and later moved to Berkeley Repertory Theater.
- The American premiere of Ken Jenkin's original play, "007 Crossfire" directed by Edward Hastings.
- "Translations" by Irish playwright, Brian Friel, directed by James Edmondson in 1986.
- A collaboration with San Jose/Cleveland Ballet company for the production of "Swan Lake" with Cynthia Gregory as prima ballerina and San Jose Rep company performing member, Joanna Munisteri in 1987.

Among the distinguished alumni of San Jose Rep's early years, all of whom were recruited by the young Artistic Director David Lemos and played significant roles in launching the young company, are: James Houghton, founding artistic director of New York City's unique Signature Theater Company; Richard Rodgers, director of the Drama Division at Juilliard; James Bundy, artistic director of Yale Repertory Theater and dean of the prestigious Yale School of Drama; Elaine Avila, associate professor of theatre dramatic writing at the University of New Mexico; fingerstyle guitarist, singer, songwriter. Educator Stevie Coyle; Cecilia Pang, Associate Chair of Theatre and Professor at University of Colorado, Boulder; Kelvin Han Yee, American actor of Asian descent with a successful film, television and theater career, Oregon Shakespeare Festival Associate Artist, director and resident actor -James Edmondson; Oregon State Representative Peter Buckley (D-Ashland), Kenneth Kelleher, artistic director of Pacific Repertory Theater and Joanne (Schmidt) Munisteri choreographer and trainer of New Zealand's Kahurangi National Maori Dance Company.

=== The Timothy Near era ===
The arrival of Timothy Near as artistic director in 1987 signaled the theatre's commitment to produce plays that spoke to the city's diverse community both directly or by inflection. The Rep achieved this with modernized versions of the classics, contemporary works, and a commitment to developing new plays.

In 1997 the company moved from the Montgomery Theater (attached to the San Jose Civic Auditorium) into the Sobrato Auditorium, a new building in downtown San Jose that was built specifically for the Rep. No longer restricted by space or required to share their venue with other organizations, the Rep was able to offer a wider range of programming, produced to high artistic and technical standards. Since moving to the new building, the Rep has commissioned several new works and has produced World premieres, U.S. premieres, and West Coast premieres.

Artistic Director Timothy Near's vision of reaching the ethnically diverse San Jose population was highlighted by opening the newly built new home of the Rep with the West Coast premiere of Thunder Knocking on the Door by African American playwright Keith Glover, with a Rep-commissioned score by Michael Butler and local blues legend Chris Cain.

In 2001, Holly Hunter appeared in a production of By the Bog of Cats in preparation for her 2004 West End revival of the play. In 2002, Lynn Redgrave appeared in a production of The Mandrake Root.

The company commissioned a locally based musical from Craig Bohmler and Mary Bracken Phillips for its 25th anniversary season. This resulted in The Haunting of Winchester, about rifle heiress Sarah Winchester and her Winchester Mystery House in San Jose. The musical premiered in September–October 2005.

=== The Rick Lombardo era ===
After Near's departure, the Rep conducted a national search and selected Rick Lombardo in 2009. Lombardo joined the financially struggling company after 13 years as the producing artistic director at New Repertory Theatre in Boston, where he was credited with bringing in a younger and more diverse audience.

Notable projects under Rick Lombardo's leadership include:

- The world premiere of Matthew Spangler's stage adaptation of The Kite Runner (play), which was named Outstanding Production at a Large Theatre by the Bay Area Theatre Critics' Circle, and which has also gone on to numerous other American and international productions.
- The American West Coast premiere of Anupama Chandrasekhar's play "Disconnect."
- The world premiere of a new rock musical adaptation of Hans Christian Andersen's The Snow Queen by Lombardo, Kirsten Brandt and Haddon Kime. After the San Jose Rep production in 2013, this musical was invited to be a featured selection in The New York Musical Theatre Festival in 2014.
- The American West Coast premiere of Melinda Lopez's play "Sonia Flew."
- The world premiere of Jonathan Marc Feldman's "Death of the Novel", which starred Vincent Kartheiser, from AMC's Mad Men.

In June 2014, the San Jose Repertory Theatre board of trustees informed Mr. Lombardo that they had voted to close the theater as he was in rehearsal for American Premiere of "Landscape With Weapon" by Joe Penhall. About the closing, Lombardo had this to say:

I was in mourning, it was the same grief I felt when my parents died.

— Rick Lombardo, "Hounded by Reality, Staging a Fairy Tale 'Snow Queen' Emerges From Defunct San Jose Theater", The New York Times

== Facilities ==
The Rep started performing at the 500+ seat Montgomery Theatre, owned by the City of San Jose. The dream of building and performing in their own theater became reality in 1997 when they moved to their new home, the Sobrato Auditorium, a few blocks away.

After the Rep closed, the building became the Susan and Phil Hammer Theatre Center named for the former mayor and her husband who were instrumental in getting the theater built. The theater consists of three seating sections, with a total capacity of 584 people.

== See also ==
- American Conservatory Theater, San Francisco
- Marin Theatre Company, Mill Valley, California
- TheatreWorks (Silicon Valley), Palo Alto, California
- Berkeley Repertory Theatre
- Santa Cruz Shakespeare, Santa Cruz, California
- Oregon Shakespeare Festival, Ashland, Oregon
