= Zoomsical =

Form of internet theatrical performance

A zoomsical, which is a portmanteau of the words "Zoom" and "musical", is a form of theatrical performance that combines dialogue, music and lyrics that is then performed, either live or recorded, for an online audience via a video conferencing platform like Zoom.

Zoomsicals can be either original works or adaptations of existing stage musicals. The zoomsical arose in 2020 as a response to the social distancing guidelines put in place in many countries to stem the spread of COVID-19. These guidelines made it impossible for many theatre companies to continue their planned seasons of rehearsals and performances, and many were cancelled. The zoomsical emerged from the necessity for musical theatre performances that could adhere to physical distancing guidelines, yet also maintain a venue for artistic self expression. Many theatre companies that produce stage musicals, having pivoted away from their live seasons, began experimenting with live streaming video platforms as a way to continue to bring new works to audiences during lockdown.

Published on 5 May 2020 by Music Theatre International, the first known zoomsical is an adaptation of the Theatre for Young Audiences production of The Big One-Oh! by Academy Award winning author Dean Pitchford. It features music by Doug Besterman, lyrics by Pitchford, and a book by Timothy Allen McDonald.

Composer, lyricist and director Haddon Kime of Atlanta is credited with creating the first original zoomsical. His zoomsical, produced and premiered by Out of Hand Theater, is entitled LAG: A Zoomsical Comedy, and premiered 30 May 2020 simultaneously on Zoom and YouTube. It has subsequently been published by composer Roger Bean's publishing company, Stage Rights International.
