= Philemon Foundation =

US non-profit organization

- Founded: 2003
- Founder: Sonu Shamdasani, Stephen Martin
- Type: Nonprofit organization
- Purpose: Complete Works of Carl Gustav Jung
- Location(s): Carpinteria, California; United States
- Website: Official Website

The Philemon Foundation is a non-profit organization that exists to prepare for publication the Complete Works of Carl Gustav Jung, beginning with the previously unpublished manuscripts, seminars and correspondences. It is estimated that an additional 30 volumes of work will be published and that the work will take three decades to complete.

== History ==
The Foundation was established in 2003 to support the work of Sonu Shamdasani, a London-based historian, in his then ongoing work of preparing Jung's Red Book for publication. Shamdasani is the co-founder of the Philemon Foundation with American Jungian analyst Stephen A. Martin.

The works to date constitute the Philemon series. Several translators and editors have contributed within the series, developing a few topical sub-series on dreams, psychology, correspondence, lectures.

== Published works ==
Many publications currently comprise the published work of the Foundation, including Jung's internationally recognized Red Book.

The various individual works within the Philemon series have been published by different publishers, including Princeton University Press and W. W. Norton & Company.

In addition to the Red Book, the Philemon Series includes:

- The Jung-White Letters, 2007 (Note: The Jung-White Letters)
- Children's Dreams, 2007 (Note: Children's Dreams: Notes from the Seminar Given in 1936-1940)
- Jung Contra Freud, 2012 (Note: Jung Contra Freud: The 1912 New York lectures on the theory of psychoanalysis)
- Introduction to Jungian psychology, 2012 (Note: Introduction to Jungian psychology: Notes on the seminar on analytical psychology given in 1925)
- The Question of Psychological Types, 2013 (Note: The Question of Psychological Types: The Correspondence of C. G. Jung and Hans Schmid-Guisan 1915-1916)
- Analytical Psychology in Exile, 2015 (Note: Analytical Psychology in Exile: The Correspondence of C. G. Jung & Erich Neumann)
- On Psychological and Visionary Art, 2015 (Note: On Psychological and Visionary Art: Notes from C. G. Jung’s Lecture on Gérard de Nerval’s Aurélia)
- Dream Interpretation Ancient and Modern, 2016, (updated edition) (Note: Dream Interpretation Ancient and Modern: Notes From the Seminar Given in 1936-1940)
- History of Modern Psychology, 2018 (Note: History of Modern Psychology: Lectures Delivered at ETH Zurich, Volume 1, 1933-1934)
- Dream Symbols of the Individuation Process, 2019 (Note: Dream Symbols of the Individuation Process: Notes of C. G. Jung's Seminars on Wolfgang Pauli's Dreams)
- On Theology and Psychology, 2020 (Note: On Theology and Psychology: The Correspondence of C. G. Jung and Adolf Keller)
- The Black Books, 2020 (Note: The Black Books 1913-1932. Notebooks of Transformation)
- Psychology of Yoga and Meditation, 2021 (Note: Psychology of Yoga and Meditation: Lectures Delivered at ETH Zurich, Volume 6: 1938–1940)
- Consciousness and the Unconscious, 2022 (Note: Consciousness and the Unconscious: Lectures Delivered at ETH Zurich, Volume II, 1934)
- Jung on Ignatius of Loyola’s Spiritual Exercises, 2023 (Note: Jung on Ignatius of Loyola's Spiritual Exercises: Lectures Delivered at ETH Zurich, Volume 7: 1939–1940)
- On Dreams and the East, 2025 (Note: On Dreams and the East: Notes of the 1933 Berlin Seminar. C. G. Jung and Heinrich Zimmer)
- Jung’s Life and Work, 2025 (Note: Jung’s Life and Work: Interviews for Memories, Dreams, Reflections with Aniela Jaffé)

== Current projects ==
- The Active Imagination: Notes from the Seminar Given in 1931
- Jung’s Unpublished Lectures at Polzeath on the Technique of Analysis and the Historical and Psychological Effects of Christianity (1923)
- Jung’s Unpublished Book on Alchemy and Individuation (1937)
- Jung and the Indologists: Jung’s Correspondences with Wihelm Hauer, Heinrich Zimmer and Mircea Eliade
- ETH Lectures (1933-1941): Volumes 3, 4, 5, 8
- The A. E. Letters: A Novella by C.G. Jung
- Jung’s 1925 Swanage Seminar and 1927 Zurich Seminar

== See also ==
- The Collected Works of C. G. Jung
- Bollingen Foundation
- e-rara.ch
