= Rick Lombardo =

American theatre director and playwright

- Born: March 24, 1959 (age 67); Brooklyn, New York, U.S.
- Occupations: director, producer, writer

Rick Lombardo (born March 24, 1959) is a prolific and award-winning American theatre director, playwright and adaptor. He is the former producing artistic director of San Jose Repertory Theatre, and the former Artistic Director of New Repertory Theatre in Watertown, Massachusetts. Lombardo is currently the artistic director of Penn State Center Stage, and the director of the School of Theatre at Penn State University and the Penn State College of Arts and Architecture.

He is an executive board member of the Stage Directors and Choreographers Society and a Senior Fellow with the American Leadership Forum Silicon Valley. He currently lives in Pennsylvania with his wife, actress Rachel Harker.

== Education ==
Lombardo attended and graduated Georgetown University with a BS in Psychology and minor in theatre, and earned the MFA in Directing from the Boston University School for the Arts.

== Life and career ==
Upon graduation Lombardo was named co-director ad interim of the theatre program at Fordham University's College at Lincoln Center from 1991 to 1992, where he also taught as an assistant professor of acting and directing for four years.

During this time Lombardo also became the founding artistic director of Stillwater Theater Company in New York City, and later as artistic director of The Players Guild in Canton, Ohio.

In 1997 Lombardo became the artistic director of New Repertory Theater, then located in Newton, Massachusetts. Over the next 12 years Lombardo would be credited with bringing in a younger audience and leading the company to a larger and more profitable theatrical venue in the Arsenal Center for the Arts in Watertown, Massachusetts where the company currently resides.

Lombardo left New Rep after the 2008–09 season to helm San Jose Repertory Theatre in San Jose, California after a national search was conducted to replace outgoing Artistic Director Timothy Near.

In 2013 Lombardo assumed the role of Producing Artistic Director of the company after a vote by the board of trustees to change the leadership model from a dual CEO structure to a single CEO model.

In June 2014, the San Jose Repertory Theatre board of trustees informed Mr. Lombardo that they had voted to close the theater as he was in rehearsal for American Premiere of "Landscape With Weapon" by Joe Penhall. About the closing, Lombardo had this to say:

I was in mourning, it was the same grief I felt when my parents died.

— Rick Lombardo, Hounded by Reality, Staging a Fairy Tale ‘Snow Queen’ Emerges From Defunct San Jose Theater, The New York Times

In July 2014 Lombardo began production of his original musical (co-written with Kirsten Brandt, and Haddon Kime) “The Snow Queen: A New Musical” for The New York Musical Theatre Festival. This production won both a favorable review from The New York Times as well as an award for Best Overall Design which Lombardo shared with David Cuthbert (lighting and projection designer), Frances Nelson McSherry (costume designer), and Haddon Kime (co-sound designer.)

In April 2015 Lombardo accepted an offer to become chair of the Department of Theatre and Performance Studies at Kennesaw State University in Kennesaw, Georgia. While at Kennesaw State University Lombardo led the initiative to create a summer professional Shakespeare company called Shakespeare Kennesaw,

In June 2018 Lombardo accepted a position as the director of the School of Theatre at Penn State University, and the artistic director of Penn State Center Stage, a professional arm of the Penn State School of Theatre which serves as a training program for emerging theatre professionals.

== Selected works directed ==
- The Snow Queen – adapted from the fairy tale by Hans Christian Andersen, book and lyrics by Rick Lombardo & Kirsten Brandt, music and lyrics by Haddon Kime, San Jose Rep, San Jose, California (December 2013)
- "Dessa Rose (musical)" – adapted from the book by Sherley Anne Williams, book and lyrics by Lynn Ahrens and music by Stephen Flaherty, New Repertory Theatre, Boston, Massachusetts (March 2008)
- "Bill W. and Dr. Bob" by Stephen Bergman and Janet Surrey, New World Stages, New York, New York (February 2007)

== Awards ==
2009 Eliott Norton Award for Sustained Excellence
