= Spirit world (Spiritualism) =

Realm inhabited by spirits in Spiritualism

The spirit world, according to spiritualism, is the world or realm inhabited by spirits, both good or evil of various spiritual manifestations. This spirit world is regarded as an external environment for spirits. The Spiritualism religious movement in the nineteenth century espoused a belief in an afterlife where an individual's awareness persists beyond death. Although independent from one another, both the spirit world and the physical world are in constant interaction. Through séances, trances, and other forms of mediumship, these worlds can consciously communicate with each other. The spirit world is sometimes described by mediums from the natural world in trance.

== History ==
By the mid-19th century most Spiritualist writers concurred that the spirit world was of "tangible substance" and a place consisting of "spheres" or "zones". Although specific details differed, the construct suggested organization and centralization. An 18th-century writer, Emanuel Swedenborg, influenced Spiritualist views of the spirit world. He described a series of concentric spheres each including a hierarchical organization of spirits in a setting more earth-like than theocentric. The spheres become gradually more illuminated and celestial. Spiritualists added a concept of limitlessness, or infinity to these spheres. Furthermore, it was defined that Laws initiated by God apply to earth as well as the spirit world.

Another common Spiritualist conception was that the spirit world is inherently good and is related to truth-seeking as opposed to things that are bad residing in a "spiritual darkness". This conception implied, as in the biblical parable Lazarus and Dives, that there is considered a greater distance between good and bad spirits than between the dead and the living. Also, the spirit world is "The Home of the Soul" as described by C. W. Leadbeater (Theosophist), suggesting that for a living human to experience the spirit world is a blissful, meaningful and life-changing experience.

Yet, John Worth Edmonds stated in his 1853 work Spiritualism, "Man's relation spiritually with the spirit-world is no more wonderful than his connection with the natural world. The two parts of his nature respond to the same affinities in the natural and spiritual worlds." He asserted, quoting Swedenborg through mediumship, that the relationship between man and the spirit world is reciprocal and thus could contain sorrow. Though ultimately, "wandering through the spheres" a path of goodness "is received at last by that Spirit whose thought is universal love forever."

== See also ==
- Afterlife
- Astral plane
- Celtic Otherworld
- Exorcism
- Ghost
- Hell
- Heaven
- List of death deities
- Paradise
- Shamanism
- Soul flight
- Spirit possession
- Spirit photography
- Spiritual warfare
- Spiritual mapping
- Territorial spirit
- The Dreaming
- Underworld/Netherworld
