= Self-transcendence =

Psychological concept: expansion of personal boundaries

Self-transcendence is a personality trait that involves the expansion or evaporation of personal boundaries. This may potentially include spiritual experiences such as considering oneself an integral part of the universe. Several psychologists, including Viktor Frankl, Abraham Maslow, and Pamela G. Reed have made contributions to the theory of self-transcendence.

Self-transcendence is distinctive as the first trait-concept of a spiritual nature to be incorporated into a major theory of personality. It is one of the "character" dimensions of personality assessed in Cloninger's Temperament and Character Inventory. It is also assessed by the Self-Transcendence Scale and the Adult Self-Transcendence Inventory.

== Nature of the trait ==
Several overlapping definitions of self-transcendence have been given. Viktor Frankl wrote, "The essentially self-transcendent quality of human existence renders man a being reaching out beyond himself."

According to Reed, self-transcendence is:

the capacity to expand self-boundaries intrapersonally (toward greater awareness of one's philosophy, values, and dreams), interpersonally (to relate to others' and one's environment), temporally (to integrate one's past and future in a way that has meaning for the present), and transpersonally (to connect with dimensions beyond the typically discernible world).

Maslow evaluates transcendence from several perspectives, such as time, space, culture, ego, opinion (opinion of others), and identification-love. "This means transcendence of the selfish Self. It also implies a wider circle of identifications, i.e., with more people approaching the limit of identification with all human beings."

Although there has not been a great deal of research into the validity of self-transcendence as a measure of spirituality, one study found that self-transcendence was related to a number of areas of belief and experience that have been traditionally considered "spiritual".

== Validity ==
There is little research evaluating the validity of self-transcendence as a measure of spiritual aspects of personality. MacDonald and Holland found that people who were convinced that they had had a spiritual experience scored higher on self-transcendence compared to those who had not. They also found that self-transcendence had positive and meaningful associations with four areas of spirituality: beliefs about the existence and relevance of spirituality; spiritual experience; paranormal beliefs; and traditional religiousness but that self-transcendence was largely unrelated to existential well-being. (Note: Existential well-being refers to having a positive sense of meaning and purpose in life and a sense of inner strength. Although considered by some to be an aspect of spirituality, some researchers have argued that existential well-being taps general psychological well-being and is not clearly related to the "spiritual" as the term has been traditionally understood.) Existential well-being was most strongly related to the Temperament and Character Inventory traits of high self-directedness and low harm avoidance. Self-directedness is associated with self-control and adaptability, whereas low harm avoidance is associated with emotional well-being. This suggests that self-transcendence may be a valid measure of areas of spirituality relating to spiritual beliefs, spiritual experiences, paranormal beliefs, and traditional religiousness, but is unrelated to having a sense of meaning and purpose in life, which is more related to other features of personality. Additionally, the dissolution-of-the-self in experience aspect of self-transcendence appears to have little relationship with spirituality and may be related to the trait's more pathological aspects.

== Pathologizing of the trait ==
Some authors have pathologized the trait. While humanistic and transpersonal theories of psychology maintain that spirituality is an essential component of health and well-being, some psychologists have instead correlated self-transcendence with various aspects of mental illness. For instance, Cloninger and colleagues have proposed that self-transcendence may represent a subclinical manifestation of mood and psychotic disorders.

Other researches have linked self-transcendence to delusions and mania. Higher self-transcendence in people with bipolar disorder may reflect residual symptoms of the disorder rather than transpersonal or spiritual consciousness.

MacDonald and Holland argued that two of the four sub-dimensions of self-transcendence identified in their study—belief in the supernatural and dissolution of the self in experience—probably account for the relationship between self-transcendence and psychopathology found by researchers. Previous research found linkages between supernatural beliefs and schizotypy, so they suggested that dissolution of the self is likely to be linked to phenomena such as absorption, dissociation, and suggestibility, which have potentially pathological implications.

Given the lack of research validating the trait, some studies can appear contradictory. For instance, people with schizophrenia tend to have poorer self-rated quality of life compared to the general population. But a study of individual differences in people with schizophrenia found that higher scores on self-transcendence and self-directedness and lower scores on harm avoidance were associated with better self-ratings of quality of life. The authors suggested that this finding accords with previous studies finding that spirituality in people with schizophrenia is associated with better adjustment to illness.

The disdain of psychopathology for spirituality led Andrew Sims to write a paper exploring the question of whether faith is a delusion from the standpoint of psychopathology. He concludes that it is not.

Instead, he notes, a survey of 1200 studies and 400 reviews concludes: ‘In the majority of studies, religious involvement is correlated with well-being, happiness and life satisfaction; hope and optimism; purpose and meaning in life; higher self-esteem; better adaptation to bereavement; greater social support and less loneliness; lower rates of depression and faster recovery from depression; lower rates of suicide and fewer positive attitudes towards suicide; less anxiety; less psychosis and fewer psychotic tendencies; lower rates of alcohol and drug use and abuse; less delinquency and criminal activity; greater marital stability and satisfaction.'

== See also ==
- Altered states of consciousness – Any condition that is significantly different from a normal waking state
- Ecstasy (emotion) – Subjective experience of total involvement of subject with object of their awareness
- Enlightenment in Buddhism – Highest spiritual goal in Buddhist cultivation
- Maslow's hierarchy of needs – Theory of developmental psychology
- Mystical psychosis – Type of abnormal mental condition
- Mysticism – Traditions of human transformation aided by religious experiences
- Nondualism – Nonconceptual awareness and interconnectedness
- Oceanic feeling – Feeling of being one with the world
- Open individualism – Philosophical view that a single subject embodies all individuals
- Religious ecstasy – Altered state of consciousness
- Religious experience – Experience interpreted within a religious framework
- Soul flight – Shamanic practice
- Transcendentalism – 19th century US philosophical movement
