= Sonu Shamdasani =

British author

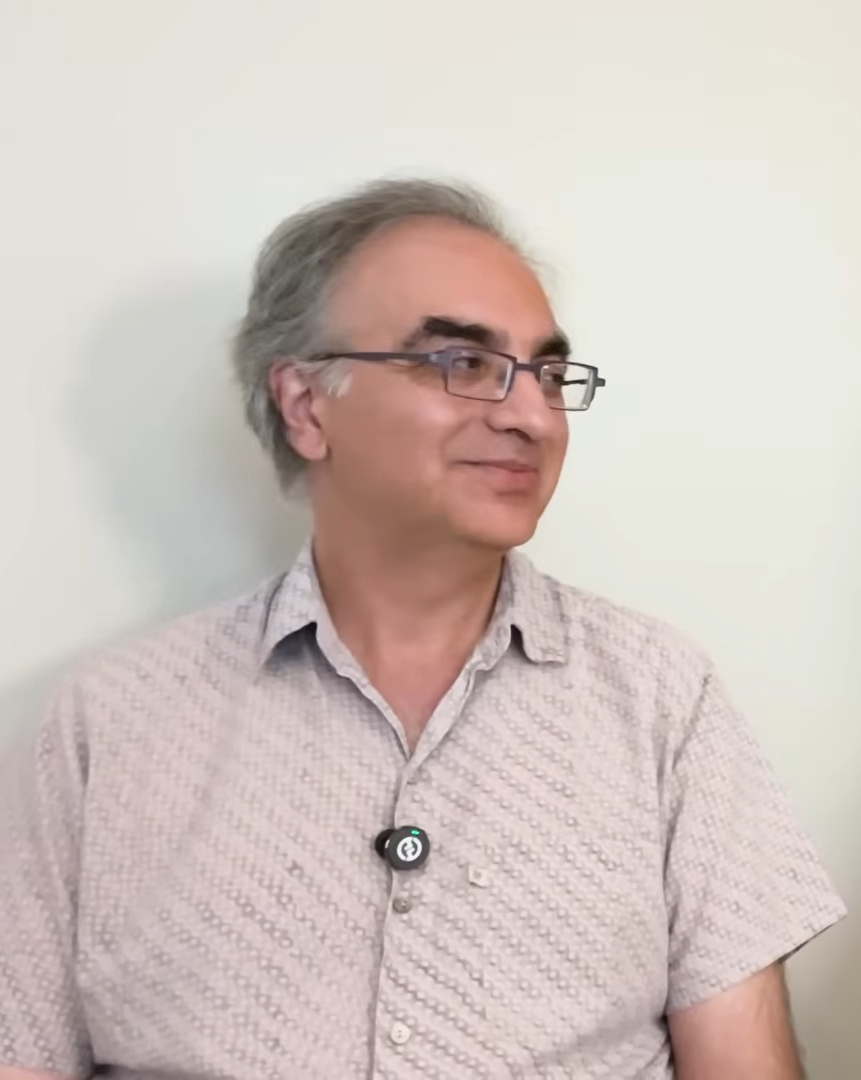
- Sonu Shamdasani on December 4, 2025.
- Born: 1962 (age 63–64); Singapore
- Education: University of Bristol; Imperial College; University College London
- Occupations: Author, editor, professor
- Employer: University College London

Sonu Shamdasani (born 1962) is a London-based author, editor in chief, and professor at University College London. His research and writings focus on Carl Gustav Jung (1875–1961) and cover the history of psychiatry and psychology from the mid-nineteenth century to current times.

Shamdasani edited the first publication of Jung's important work, Liber Novus, The Red Book. Although its title had been well known for years, it was not until 2009 that its contents were revealed to the public and practicing psychotherapists.

== Education and academic career ==
He gained his BA from Bristol University in 1984, followed by an MSc in the History of Science and Medicine at University College London/Imperial College London. Later Shamdasani was awarded a PhD in the History of Medicine from University College London's Wellcome Institute for the History of Medicine. He then became a professor at the Institute.

In a 2009 interview with the Times of India, Shamdasani gave this brief biographical note:

"I am a Sindhi, I was born in Singapore and grew up in England. I first encountered Jung when I was travelling in India in my teens, looking for a guru. The first work of his that I came across was his commentary to The Secret of the Golden Flower, which was my first introduction to psychology. I then saw the text as promising the possibility of a mediation between Eastern mysticism and Western rationality. After further study, I thought that contemporary psychology and psychotherapy was in a mess, and I wanted to figure out how it had got into this state. This led me to the studying the history of psychology".

In 2003 Shamdasani founded, along with Stephen Martin, the Philemon Foundation, which sought to publish all of Jung's works. Although Jung's Collected Works had been published in twenty volumes, there were manuscripts and other works by Jung that remained unpublished. Shamdasani commenced and continues now his labors at Philemon as the foundation's General Editor.

Currently (2016) Shamdasani serves as a professor in the School of European Languages, Culture, and Society (SELCS) at University College London, and is also Director of the UCL Centre for the History of Psychological Disciplines.

== The Red Book ==
By 2000 Shamdasani had arranged to begin work editing Jung's The Red Book. In 2003 he stepped in as editor of the Philemon Foundation's successful project to publish, in 2009, this much awaited volume. Although Jung had worked on the writing and the designs for it between 1914 and 1930, he did not then have it published. In 1959 Jung added a short Epilogue to his Red Book, commenting on his 'confrontation with the unconscious' that started prior to World War I: "It could have developed into [madness] had I not been able to hold the overpowering force of the original experiences. ... I knew of nothing better than to write them down... and to paint the images that appeared when reliving it all—as well as I could."

Shamdasani describes Jung's unusual work, an illustrated volume of calligraphy, as "the book that stands at the center of his oeuvre" which "has long been recognized as the key to comprehending" Jung. The Red Book "was at the center of Jung's self-experimentation." Earlier Shamdasani stated:

If one does not place Jung's confrontation with the unconscious in a proper perspective, or understand the significance of the Red Book, one is in no place to understand fully Jung's intellectual development from 1913 onwards, and not only that, but his life as well: it was his inner life which dictated his movements in the world. ... For Jung's work on his fantasies in Black Books and the Red Book formed the core of his later work, as he himself contended. The Red Book is at the center of Jung's life and work. [Understanding Jung] without an accurate account of it would be like writing the life of Dante without the Commedia, or Goethe without Faust.

Jung's heirs had for many decades held the original manuscript of the Red Book in a bank vault for safe-keeping. They withheld its publication and declined offers to do so. During the 1990s Shamdasani's research, however, had uncovered the existence of text from the Book outside the family's control. Another transcription was found by Marie-Louise von Franz. It was demonstrated that Jung had sent a copy of his manuscript to a publisher. Shamdasani entered into delicate negotiations with Jung's descendants in Zürich and, in May 2000, obtained their agreement "to release the work for publication". His editing tasks then began.

== The Critical Edition of the Works of C. G. Jung ==
As of 2027, Shamdasani became the editor-in-chief of The Critical Edition of the Works of C. G. Jung.

== Selected bibliography ==
Author

- Cult Fictions: C. G. Jung and the Founding of Analytical Psychology (London: Routledge, 1998).
- Jung and the Making of Modern Psychology: The Dream of a Science (Cambridge University Press, 2003).
- Jung Stripped Bare by His Biographers, Even (London: Karnac Books, 2004).
- C. G. Jung. A biography in Books (New York: W. W. Norton & Company, 2012).

Co-author

- Mikkel Borch-Jacobsen & Shamdasani, Le Dossier Freud. Enquête sur l'histoire de la psychoanalyse (Paris: Les empêcheurs de penser en rond/Le Seuil, 2006).
- Mikkel Borch-Jacobsen & Shamdasani, The Freud Files: An Inquiry into the History of Psychoanalysis (Cambridge University Press, 2012).
- James Hillman & Shamdasani, Lament of the Dead. Psychology After Jung's Red Book (New York: W. W. Norton & Company, 2013).

Editor

- C. G. Jung, The Psychology of Kundalini Yoga. Notes of the Seminar Given in 1932 by C. G. Jung (Bollingen/Princeton University, 1996), Introduction by Shamdasani.
- C. G. Jung, The Red Book. Liber Novus (Philemon Series & New York/London: W. W. Norton & Company, 2009), Introduction by Shamdasani.
- C. G. Jung, History of Modern Psychology: Lectures Delivered at the ETH Zurich, Volume 1, 1933–1934 (Philemon Series & Princeton University Press, 2018).
- C. G. Jung, The Black Books of C.G. Jung (1913–1932) (Stiftung der Werke von C. G. Jung & W. W. Norton & Company, 2020).
- C. G. Jung and Aniela Jaffé, Jung's Life and Work: Interviews for Memories, Dreams, Reflections with Aniela Jaffé (Princeton University Press, Philemon Series, 2025).
- The Critical Edition of the Works of C. G. Jung (Princeton University Press, 2027).
