= Black Books (Jung) =

Collection of Carl Jung's private journals

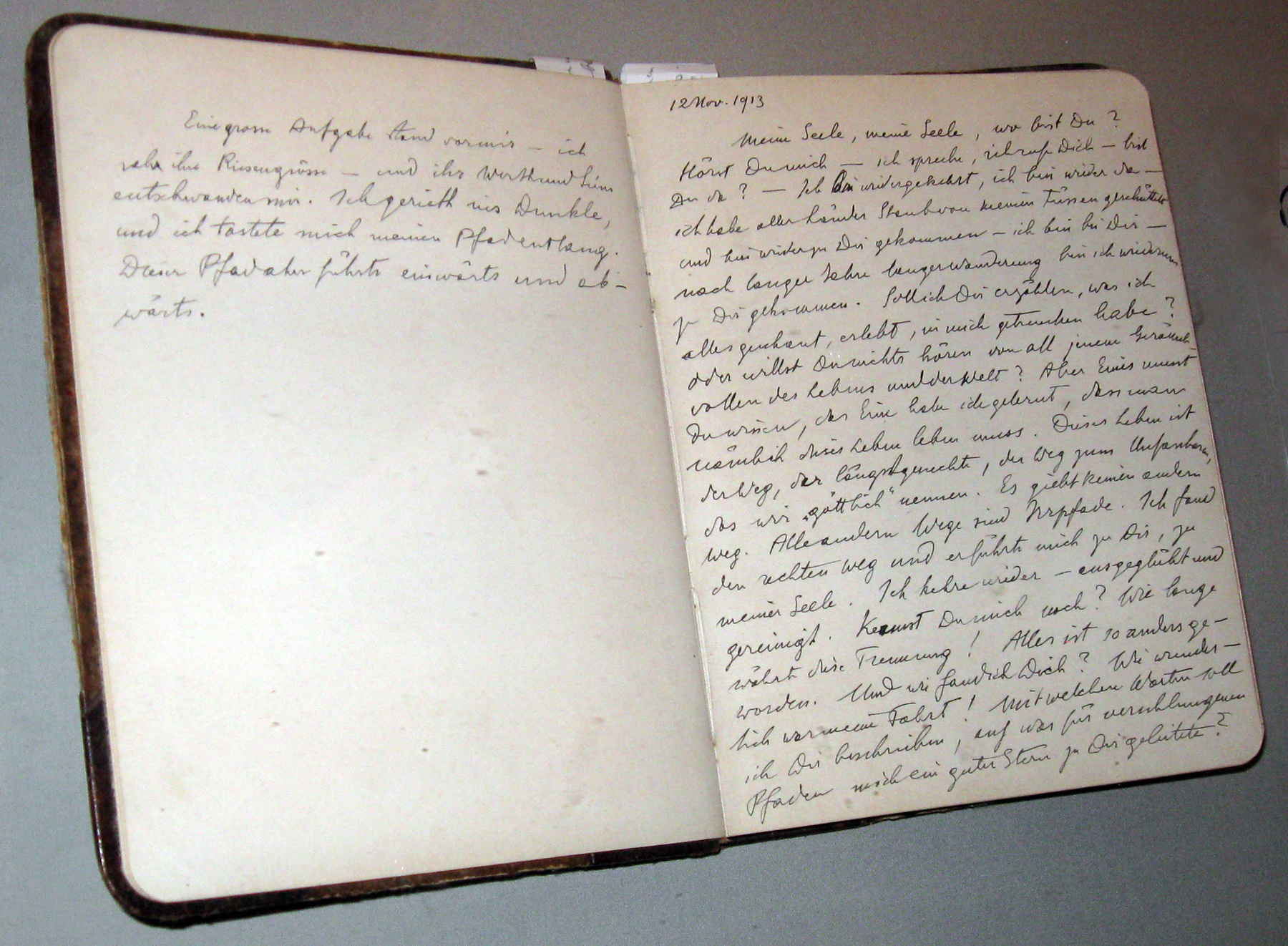
- Jung's Black Book journal 2, opened to the beginning entry of 12 November 1913
- Author: Carl Gustav Jung
- Original title: The Black Books 1913-1932. Notebooks of Transformation
- Translator: Martin Liebscher; John Peck; Sonu Shamdasani
- Publisher: Philemon Foundation and W. W. Norton & Co.
- Publication date: 2020
- Pages: 1,648
- ISBN: 9780393088649

The Black Books are a collection of seven private journals recorded by Carl Gustav Jung principally between 1913 and 1932. They have been referred to as the "Black Books" due to the colour of the final five journal covers (the first two journals actually have a brown cover).

The portion of the journal account that is of particular interest begins in the second of the seven journals, on the night of 12 November 1913. Jung's motivation was to conduct a difficult "experiment" on himself consisting of a confrontation with the contents of his mind, paying no heed to the daily occurrences of his ordinary life. The journal entries continue over several following years and fill the next six notebooks. In these notebooks Carl Jung recorded his imaginative and visionary experiences during the transformative period that has been called his "confrontation with the unconscious."

This ledger of experiences was the foundation for the text of Jung's Red Book: Liber Novus. The majority of the journal entries were made prior to 1920, however Jung continued to make occasional entries up until at least 1932. Though the "Black Books" are referenced and occasionally quoted by Sonu Shamdasani in his editorial to The Red Book: Liber Novus, the journals have otherwise previously been unavailable for academic study.

== Context and content ==
Jung recorded these deliberately-evoked fantasies or visions in the "Black Books". These journals are Jung's contemporaneous clinical ledger to his "most difficult experiment", or what he later describes as "a voyage of discovery to the other pole of the world." He later termed the process "mythopoetic imagination". The events and visions were recorded nightly in the "Black Book" journals. The first entry on 12 November 1913 begins with this petition:

My soul, my soul, where are you? Do you hear me? I speak, I call you – are you there? I have returned, I am here again. I have shaken the dust of all the lands from my feet, and I have come to you, I am with you. After long years of long wandering, I have come to you again....

Do you still know me? How long the separation lasted! Everything has become so different. And how did I find you? How strange my journey was! What words should I use to tell you on what twisted paths a good star has guided me to you? Give me your hand, my almost forgotten soul. How warm the joy at seeing you again, you long disavowed soul. Life has led me back to you. ... My soul, my journey should continue with you. I will wander with you and ascend to my solitude.

The record continues with increasing intensity through the summer of 1914. A hiatus in the journal entries came between June 1914 and late summer of 1915. During this period Jung drafted his first manuscript of Liber Novus.

After the outbreak of World War I in August 1914, Jung perceived that his visionary experiences during the prior year had been not only of personal relevance, but entwined with a crucial cultural moment. In late-1914 and 1915 he compiled the visions from three of the completed journals, adding a commentary on each imaginative episode, into a draft manuscript. This draft text served as the beginning of the Red Book.

In August 1915, after completing a first draft of Liber Novus, the visionary events and journal entries resumed. By 1916, Jung had filled six of the seven journals. Entries become more sporadic after about 1920, but occasional entries were added to the seventh and last "Black Book" through at least 1932.

Biographer Barbara Hannah, who was close to Jung throughout the last three decades of his life, compared Jung's imaginative experiences recounted in his journals to the encounter of Menelaus with Proteus in the Odyssey. Jung, she said, "made it a rule never to let a figure or figures that he encountered leave until they had told him why they had appeared to him." In his introduction to Liber Novus, Shamdasani explains:

From December 1913 onward, he carried on in the same procedure: deliberately evoking a fantasy in a waking state, and then entering into it as into a drama. These fantasies may be understood as a type of dramatized thinking in pictorial form.... In retrospect, he recalled that his scientific question was to see what took place when he switched off consciousness. The example of dreams indicated the existence of background activity, and he wanted to give this a possibility of emerging, just as one does when taking mescaline.

== Publication ==
The "Black Books" have been edited by Sonu Shamdasani for publication in a facsimile edition: The Black Books of C.G. Jung (1913–1932), ed. Sonu Shamdasani, (Stiftung der Werke von C. G. Jung & W. W. Norton & Company). They were published in 2020.

In preview information about this publication, the editor further explained the relationship between the "Black Books" and Jung's Red Book:

The text of The Red Book draws on material from The Black Books between 1913 and 1916. Approximately fifty percent of the text of The Red Book derives directly from The Black Books, with very light editing and reworking. The "Black Books" are not personal diaries, but the records of the unique self-experimentation which Jung called his ‘confrontation with the unconscious’. He did not record day to day happenings or outer events, but his active imaginations and depictions of his mental states together with his reflections on these. The material which Jung did not include in The Red Book is of equal interest to the material which he did include.

== See also ==
- Magical record
- Seven Sermons to the Dead

== Bibliography ==
- Jung, Carl Gustav (2020). Sonu Shamdasani (ed.). The Black Books of C. G. Jung. Facsimile edition of seven volumes in hardcover (Slipcased Edition), 1,648 pages. Translated by Martin Liebscher, John Peck and Sonu Shamdasani. Philemon Series & W. W. Norton & Co. ISBN 9780393088649.
