= Ideas and delusions of reference =

Phenomenon involving innocuous events

Ideas of reference and delusions of reference describe the phenomenon of an individual experiencing innocuous events or mere coincidences and believing they have strong personal significance. It is "the notion that everything one perceives in the world relates to one's own destiny", usually in a negative and hostile manner.

In psychiatry, delusions of reference form part of the diagnostic criteria for psychotic illnesses such as schizophrenia, delusional disorder, schizoaffective disorder and bipolar disorder with mania, as well as for schizotypal personality disorder. To a lesser extent, their presence can be a hallmark of paranoid personality disorder, as well as body dysmorphic disorder. They can be found in autism during periods of intense stress. They can also be caused by intoxication, such as from stimulants like methamphetamine. Psychedelics like psilocybin have also been reported to produce ideas of reference during experiences. They are also a common side effect of cannabis in which benign innocous events are believed by the experiencing individual to be personally significant, and can be caused by high-THC cannabis, especially in sensitive individuals or high doses. These experiences are part of temporary, dose-related psychotic symptoms like paranoia, delusions, and anxiety.

== Examples ==
Persons with ideas of reference may experience:

- Believing that "somehow everyone on a passing city bus is talking about them".
- Feeling that people on television or radio are either talking about them or talking directly to them.
- Believing that headlines or articles in newspapers have been written exclusively for them.
- Believing that events (even world events) have been deliberately contrived for them, or have special personal significance for them.
- Believing that the lyrics of a song are specifically about them.
- Believing that the normal function of cell phones, computers, and other electronic devices is to send secret and significant messages that only they can understand or believe.
- Perceiving objects or events as having been deliberately set up to convey a particular meaning to themselves.
- Thinking "that the slightest careless movement on the part of another person had great personal meaning...increased significance".
- Thinking that posts on social networking websites or Internet blogs have hidden meanings pertaining to them.
- Believing that the behavior of others is in reference to an abnormal, offensive body odor, which in reality is non-existent and cannot be smelled or detected by others (see: olfactory reference syndrome).

== Psychoanalytic views ==
In Sigmund Freud's view, "Delusions of being watched present this power in a regressive form, thus revealing its genesis...voices, as well as the undefined multitude, are brought into the foreground again by the [paranoid] disease, and so the evolution of conscience is reproduced regressively." As early as 1928, Freud's contemporary, Carl Jung, introduced the concept of synchronicity, a theory of "meaningful coincidences".

In 1946, Otto Fenichel concluded that "the projection of the superego is most clearly seen in ideas of reference and of being influenced....Delusions of this kind merely bring to the patient from the outside what his self-observing and self-critical conscience actually tells him."

Jacques Lacan similarly saw ideas of reference as linked to "the unbalancing of the relation to the capital Other and the radical anomaly that it involves, qualified, improperly, but not without some approximation to the truth, in old clinical medicine, as partial delusion"—the "big other, that is, the other of language, the Names-of-the-Father, signifiers or words", in short, the realm of the superego.

== Anti-psychiatry ==
Validation rather than clinical condemnation of ideas of reference is frequently expressed by anti-psychiatrists, on the grounds, for example, that "the patient's ideas of reference and influence and delusions of persecution were merely descriptions of her parents' behavior toward her." While accepting that "there is certainly confusion between persecutory fantasies and persecutory realities", figures like David Cooper believe that "ideas of connection with apparently remote people, or ideas of being influenced by others equally remote, are in fact stating their experience" of social influence – albeit in a distorted form by "including in their network of influence institutions as absurd as Scotland Yard, the Queen of England, the President of the United States, or the BBC".

R. D. Laing took a similar view of the person who was "saying that his brains have been taken from him, that his actions are controlled from outer space, etc. "Such delusions are partially achieved derealization-realizations." Laing also considered how "in typical paranoid ideas of reference, the person feels that the murmurings and mutterings he hears as he walks past a street crowd are about him. In a bar, a burst of laughter behind his back is at some joke cracked about him", but felt that deeper acquaintance with the patient reveals in fact that "what tortures him is not so much his delusions of reference, but his harrowing suspicion that he is of no importance to anyone, that no one is referring to him at all."

== Delusions of reference ==
Ideas of reference must be distinguished from delusions of reference, which may be similar in content but are held with greater conviction. With the former, but not the latter, the person holding them may have "the feeling that strangers are talking about him/her, but if challenged, acknowledges that the people may be talking about something else".

From the psychoanalytic view, there may be at the same time "transitions...to delusions" from ideas of reference: "abortive ideas of reference, in the beginning of their development or, in schizotypal personalities, continuously, may remain subject to the patient's criticism...under adverse circumstances, by minimal economic shifts, however, reality testing may be lost and daydreams of this kind turn into delusions."

It has been noted that a person "rigidly controlled by his superego...readily forms sensitive ideas of reference. A key experience may occur in his life circumstances and quite suddenly these ideas become structured as delusions of reference." Within the "focus of paranoia...that man crossing his legs, that woman wearing that blouse—it can't just be accidental. It has a particular meaning, is intended to convey something."

== Literary analogues ==
- In Mrs Dalloway (1925), as a plane flies over a shell-shocked soldier: "So, thought Septimus, they are signalling to me...smoke words". The author, Virginia Woolf, recorded in a memoir how she herself "had lain in bed...thinking that the birds were singing Greek choruses and that King Edward was using the foulest possible language among Ozzie Dickinson's azaleas".
- In Margaret Mahy's Memory (1987), the confused adolescent hero decides "to abandon himself to the magic of chance. From now on his signposts would be words overheard accidentally, graffiti, advertisements, street names...the clues the city offered him."
- The Naval Intelligence hero of Patrick O'Brian's Treason's Harbour (1983) reflects ruefully that "after a while an intelligence-agent tended to see spies everywhere, rather as certain lunatics saw references to themselves in every newspaper."
- In Vladimir Nabokov's short story "Signs and Symbols" (1948), the parents of a suicidal youth suffering from a variation of this illness, "referential mania", decide to remove him from a hospital in order to keep a more watchful eye.

== See also ==
- Apophenia
- Astrology
- Coincidance: A Head Test
- Confirmation bias
- Generalized other
- Hostile attribution bias
- Imaginary friend
- Paranoiac-critical method
- Pareidolia
- Personal boundaries
- Reference group
- Synchronicity
- Synchronicity (book)
