= Subjective validation =

Type of psychological bias

Subjective validation, sometimes called personal validation effect, is a cognitive bias by which people will consider a statement or another piece of information to be correct if it has any personal meaning or significance to them. People whose opinion is affected by subjective validation will perceive two unrelated events (i.e., a coincidence) to be related because their personal beliefs demand that they be related. Closely related to the Forer effect, subjective validation is an important element in cold reading. It is considered to be the main reason behind most reports of paranormal phenomena. According to Bob Carroll, psychologist Ray Hyman is considered to be the foremost expert on cold reading.

The term subjective validation first appeared in the 1980 book The Psychology of the Psychic by David F. Marks and Richard Kammann.

Subjective validation describes the tendency of people to believe or accept an idea or statement if it presents to them in a personal and positive way. An example of subjective validation can be found in horoscopes, which often make vague, easily generalized personal statements, sometimes referred to as "Barnum statements", designed to apply to nearly any individual, such as: "You have a great deal of unused capacity, which you have not turned to your advantage." This can cause one to attribute future success to the horoscope and feel as if their belief in it has been validated. In essence, subjective validation is a confirmation bias towards information that personally benefits one's self-esteem.

Many of the validations that are given are not necessarily because they are true about recipients but because people wish it was true about themselves; people tend to think of themselves in terms of values that are important to them, even if they don't show those values. They tend to believe they do, and they tend to believe it the more they hear it and read it about themselves.

This effect can be seen when it comes to health. For example, if someone enjoys eating bacon and they were to come across an article that talks about bacon being healthy, they will tend to believe it more because this "validates" eating more bacon.

== Examples ==
One test was performed by Michael Gauquelin, a French psychologist. He offered people free horoscopes to anyone that read Ici Paris on the condition that they provided feedback on how accurately the horoscope related to them. He sent out thousands of the same horoscopes to people with various astrological signs. Ninety-four per cent of the readers responded that his readers were "very accurate and insightful." What the people did not know was that the horoscope was for Dr. Petiot, a convicted serial killer of 63 people. This is clearly another case of subjective validation where subjects focus on the relatable nature of some general analysis that's supposed to be unique to them.

Another test is the Bertram R. Forer personality test. Forer would give his students a personality test and regardless of his students' answers he would give them all the same personality results and ask them how well the personality result described them on a scale of 0–5, the average score was 4.26. This test has been repeated many times and the average is still around 4.2.

== See also ==
- Belief
- Confirmation bias
- David Marks (psychologist)
- List of biases in judgment and decision making
- Self-deception
- Self propaganda
- True-believer syndrome
- Barnum effect
- Truthiness
