= The Roots of Coincidence =

1972 book on parapsychology

- First UK edition (1972, Hutchinson)
- Author: Arthur Koestler
- Language: English
- Subject: Parapsychology
- Published: 1972
- Media type: Print
- ISBN: 0091102804

The Roots of Coincidence is a 1972 book by Arthur Koestler. It is an introduction to theories of parapsychology, including extrasensory perception and psychokinesis. Koestler postulates links between modern physics, their interaction with time and paranormal phenomena. It is influenced by Carl Jung's concept of synchronicity and the seriality of Paul Kammerer.

In the book Koestler argues that science needs to take the possibility of the occurrence of phenomena that are outside our common sense view of the world more seriously and study them. He concludes that paranormal events are rare, unpredictable and capricious and need a paradoxical combination of skillful scientific experiment with a childlike excitement to be seen and recorded.

The psychologist David Marks initially was critical of Koestler's book for endorsing pseudoscience. Marks noted that Koestler uncritically accepted ESP experiments and ignored evidence that did not fit his hypothesis. In The Psychology of the Psychic Marks coined the term "Koestler's Fallacy" as the assumption that odd matches of random events cannot arise by chance. Marks illustrates the fact that such odd matches do regularly occur with examples from his own experience. In "Psychology and the Paranormal: Exploring Anomalous Experience" Marks (2020) modifies his position by suggesting that a few coincidences are so extremely improbable that they warrant more serious scientific attention. Subjective anomalous experiences defy scientific explanation precisely because they are so improbable (e.g. a coincidence with an estimated probability of ten to the minus 18) and they never can be consciously controlled. Traditional statistical hypothesis testing using the .05 level obviously cannot be applied suggesting a double standard. John Beloff gave the book a mixed review, describing it as "a typical Koestlerian performance" but noting that some of his claims about psychical research were inaccurate.

== Appearances in popular culture ==
In Volume 7 of Alan Moore and David Lloyd's V for Vendetta, Inspector Finch is seen reading The Roots of Coincidence. Koestler is referenced several times in the work, and in the movie novelization by Steve Moore. Koestler's ideas had previously made their way into the Dr. Manhattan issues of Moore's and Dave Gibbons' Watchmen.

It also played a significant role in Episode 4 ("Entangled") of Series X of Red Dwarf, to explain the cause of apparent coincidences. The cover of the Picador paperback edition, with dominoes in the foreground representing star coordinates, is integral to furthering the plot of this episode.

The musician Sting was an avid reader of Koestler. Sting named The Police's final studio album Synchronicity as a reference to The Roots of Coincidence. He had named The Police's previous album, Ghost in the Machine, after another of Koestler's books.

"The Roots of Coincidence" is also the name of an instrumental by fusion jazz ensemble Pat Metheny Group, featured on their 1997 album Imaginary Day. The track won the 1999 Grammy Award for Best Rock Instrumental Performance (see there for references).

== Publication data ==
- The Roots of Coincidence (1972), US, Random House hardcover: ISBN 0-394-48038-4
- The Roots of Coincidence (1972), UK, Hutchinson hardcover: ISBN 0-09-110280-4
- 1973 Vintage paperback: ISBN 0-394-71934-4

== See also ==
- Apophenia
- Coincidance, 1988 book by Robert Anton Wilson
- Pareidolia
- Synchromysticism
- Synchronicity
