= Synchromysticism =

Belief system attributing meaning to coincidences

Synchromysticism is the practice of attributing mystical or esoteric significance to coincidences. The word, a portmanteau of synchronicity and mysticism, was coined by Jake Kotze in August 2006. Synchromysticism has been described as a phenomenon "existing on the fringe of areas already considered fringe". Steven Sutcliffe and Carole Cusack describe synchromysticism as "part artistic practice, part spiritual or metaphysical system, part conspiracy culture", while Jason Horsley describes it as "a form of postmodern animism" that "combines Jung's notion of meaningful coincidences with the quest for the divine, or self-actualization through experience of the divine."

== Precursors and concept ==
Synchronicity is a concept first introduced by analytical psychologist Carl Jung, which holds that events are "meaningful coincidences" if they occur with no causal relationship yet seem to be meaningfully related. Jung defined synchronicity as an "acausal connecting (togetherness) principle", "meaningful coincidence", and "acausal parallelism."

Jung's belief was that, just as events may be connected by causality, they may also be connected by meaning. Jung used the concept in arguing for the existence of the paranormal. A believer in the paranormal, Arthur Koestler wrote extensively on synchronicity in his 1972 book The Roots of Coincidence.

Mysticism, in turn, has been loosely defined as union with God or the Absolute. An influential proponent of this understanding was William James (1842–1910), who stated that "in mystic states we both become one with the Absolute and we become aware of our oneness." James popularized this use of the term "religious experience" in his The Varieties of Religious Experience, contributing to the interpretation of mysticism as a distinctive experience, comparable to sensory experiences. Religious experiences belong to the "personal religion", which he considered to be "more fundamental than either theology or ecclesiasticism".

Synchromysticism, as the union of synchronicity and mysticism, is thus the sense of interconnectedness and oneness with reality that comes from a heightened and enhanced awareness of synchronicity. A form of "postmodern animism", Horsley argues that synchromysticism "underlines a common theme beneath three apparently disparate areas: that of the religious quest for meaning or 'signs,' the shamanic/animistic relationship with Nature, and the schizophrenic's inability to distinguish between reality and fantasy."

== Within chaos magic ==
Chaos magic is a contemporary magical practice consisting of "techniques" (most frequently, entering into an altered state of consciousness and manipulating symbols) to attain objective "results" in physical reality. From the beginning, the founders of chaos magic were explicit in stating that these "results" take the form of synchronicities, with Peter J. Carroll stating in Liber Null & Psychonaut (1978):

All magical paradigms partake of some form of action at a distance, be it distance in space or time or both... In magic this is called synchronicity. A mental event, perception, or an act of will occurs at the same time (synchronously) as an event in the material world... Of course, this can always be excused as coincidence, but most magicians would be quite content with being able to arrange coincidences.

Essentially, chaos magic consists of a set of techniques for deliberately engineering synchronicities. As Carroll makes clear in later texts, magical "results" consist of "meaningful coincidences" or "a series of events going somewhat improbably in the desired direction."

== Influence ==
On May 9, 2008, Reality Sandwich published "The Cryptic Cosmology of Synchromysticism", a long article on the ideas, movement, and its origins. It notes that Jake Kotze's work got a boost in exposure after Henrik Palmgren's conspiracy site Red Ice Creations began featuring articles and videos from Brave New World Order. Henrik also recorded a series of podcast interviews with Jake throughout 2007.

"The Secret Life of Movies: Schizophrenic and Shamanic Journeys in American Cinema" by Jason Horsley and published by McFarland Publishing in 2009 makes multiple references to synchromysticism. He writes:

The recent but rapidly growing movement known as "synchromysticism" is anything but an academic discipline. Rather than emerging from the hallowed halls of academia, synchromysticism was born on the Internet, a new, more "upbeat" development in the paranoid community (i.e., among occultists and conspiracy theorists) that attempts to see beyond the darker aspects of society, politics, and popular culture, to a cosmic design. A form of postmodern animism, as the name suggests, synchromysticism combines Jung's notion of meaningful coincidences with the quest for the divine, or self-actualization through experience of the divine. Not the first thing most of us associate with movies, and yet nor is it the last. Martin Scorsese was surely not alone in comparing the experience of sitting in a movie theater with attending church.

In a 2013 spotlight, visual artist Mikey Cook says that he creates his work "via a synchromystic filter". In 2015 IDigitalTimes interviewed Joe Alexander, filmmaker and member of the synchromystic community, about the viral video "BACK TO THE FUTURE predicts 9/11". Alexander claims that "Rodney Ascher, while making Room 237, found the sync community". The Washington Post wrote that synchromystics "... believe that 9/11 and Back to the Future—and everything in the universe, really—are connected by a vast Web of unseen, mystical, esoteric ties."

== See also ==
- Apophenia
- Pareidolia
