= Barnum effect =

Tendency to interpret vague statements as meaningful ones

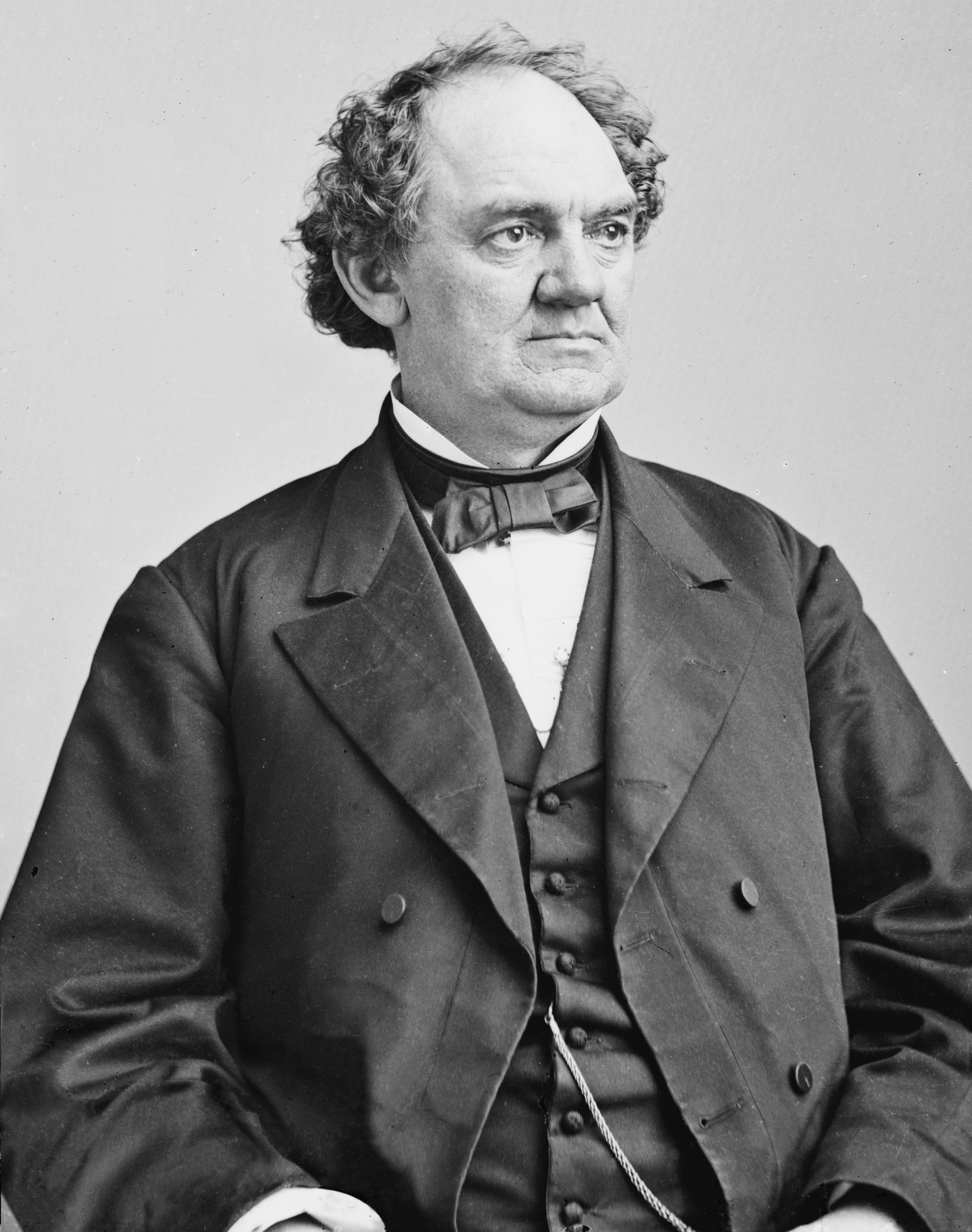
Phineas Taylor Barnum between 1855 and 1865

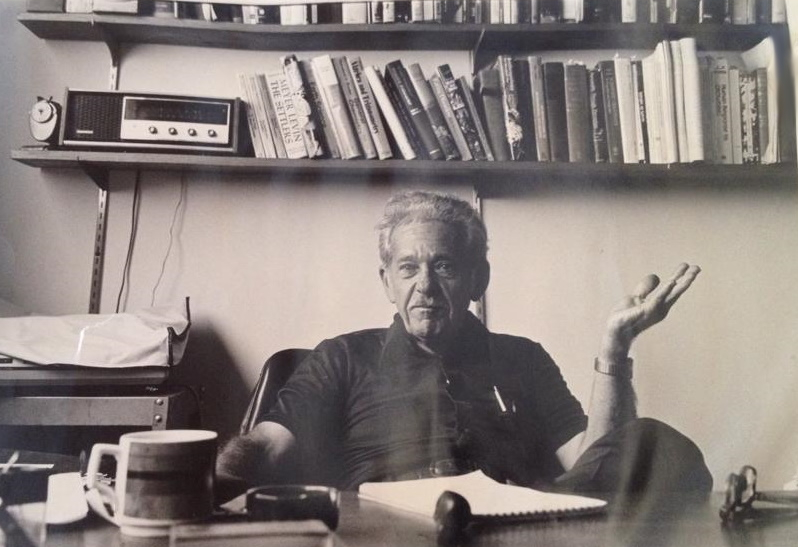
Bertram Forer

The Barnum effect, also called the Forer effect or, less commonly, the Barnum–Forer effect, is a common psychological phenomenon whereby individuals give high accuracy ratings to descriptions of their personality that supposedly are tailored specifically to them, yet which are in fact vague and general enough to apply to a broad range of people. This effect can provide a partial explanation for the widespread acceptance of some paranormal beliefs and practices, such as astrology, fortune telling, aura reading, and some types of personality tests.

Psychologist Bertram Forer originally called it the "fallacy of personal validation" in 1949. Psychologist Paul E. Meehl coined the term "Barnum effect" in 1956 in his essay "Wanted – A Good Cookbook", because he relates the vague personality descriptions used in certain "pseudo-successful" psychological tests to those given by showman P. T. Barnum.

== Overview ==
The Barnum effect is manifested in response to statements that are called "Barnum statements", meaning that general characterizations attributed to an individual are perceived to be true for them, even though the statements are such generalizations that they could apply to almost anyone. Such techniques are used by fortune tellers, astrologers, and other practitioners to convince customers that they, the practitioners, are in fact endowed with a paranormal gift. The effect is a specific example of the "acceptance phenomenon", which describes the general tendency of humans "to accept almost any bogus personality feedback". A related and more general phenomenon is that of subjective validation.

== Early research ==
In 1947, psychologist Ross Stagner asked a number of personnel managers to take a personality test. After they had taken the test, Stagner, instead of responding with feedback based on their actual individual answers, presented each of them with generalized feedback that had no relation to their test answers but that was, instead, based on horoscopes, graphological analyses, and the like. Each of the managers was then asked how accurate the assessment was. More than half described the assessment as accurate, and almost none described it as wrong.

In 1948, in what has been described as a "classic experiment", psychologist Forer gave a psychology test – his "Diagnostic Interest Blank" – to 39 of his psychology students, who were told that they would each receive a brief personality vignette based on their test results. One week later Forer gave each student a purportedly individualized vignette and asked each of them to rate it on how well it applied. In reality, each student received the same vignette, consisting of the following items:

1. You have a great need for other people to like and admire you.
2. You have a tendency to be critical of yourself.
3. You have a great deal of unused capacity which you have not turned to your advantage.
4. While you have some personality weaknesses, you are generally able to compensate for them.
5. Your sexual adjustment has presented problems for you.
6. Disciplined and self-controlled outside, you tend to be worrisome and insecure inside.
7. At times you have serious doubts as to whether you have made the right decision or done the right thing.
8. You prefer a certain amount of change and variety and become dissatisfied when hemmed in by restrictions and limitations.
9. You pride yourself as an independent thinker and do not accept others' statements without satisfactory proof.
10. You have found it unwise to be too frank in revealing yourself to others.
11. At times you are extroverted, affable, sociable, while at other times you are introverted, wary, reserved.
12. Some of your aspirations tend to be pretty unrealistic.
13. Security is one of your major goals in life.

On average, the students rated its accuracy as 4.30 on a scale of 0 (very poor) to 5 (excellent). Only after the ratings were turned in, it was revealed that all students had received an identical vignette assembled by Forer from a newsstand astrology book.

Forer attributed the effect to gullibility. The effect has been said to confirm the Pollyanna principle, where individuals tend "to use or accept positive words of feedback more frequently than negative words of feedback".

== Factors influencing the effect ==
Two factors are important in producing the Forer effect, according to the findings of replication studies. The content of the description offered is important, with specific emphasis on the ratio of positive to negative trait assessments. The other important factor is that the subject trusts the honesty of the person providing feedback.

The effect is consistently found when the assessment statements are vague. People are able to read their own meaning into the statements they receive, and thus the statement becomes "personal" to them. The most effective statements include the phrase "at times", such as "At times you feel very sure of yourself, while at other times you are not as confident." This phrase can apply to almost anyone, and thus each person can read a "personal" meaning into it. Keeping statements vague in this manner ensures observing the Forer effect in replication studies.

Individuals are more likely to accept negative assessments of themselves if they perceive the persons presenting the assessments as high-status professionals. Evidence also suggests that people with authoritarian or neurotic personalities or who have a greater than usual need for approval are more likely to manifest the Barnum effect.

Later studies have found that subjects give higher accuracy ratings if the following are true:

- The subject believes that the analysis is personalized, and thus applies personal meaning to the statements.
- The subject believes in the authority of the evaluator.
- The analysis lists mainly positive traits.

== Exploiting the effect ==
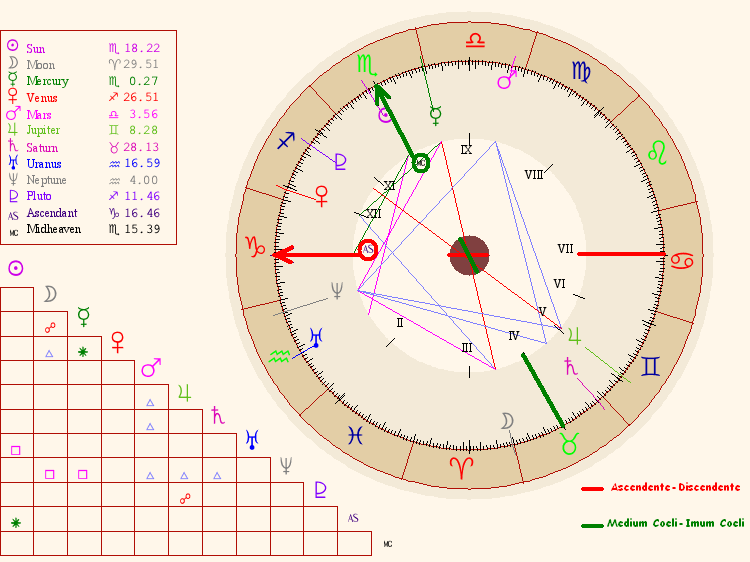
Horoscope

In 1977, Ray Hyman wrote about the way in which hucksters exploit the Forer effect to take advantage of victims (or "marks"). He provided a list of factors that help these tricksters to dupe their prey. For example, hucksters are more likely to be successful if they exude an air of confidence ("If you look and act as if you believe in what you are doing, you will be able to sell even a bad reading to most of your subjects"), if they "[m]ake creative use of the latest statistical abstracts, polls, and surveys" showing "what various subclasses of our society believe, do, want, worry about, and so on", if they employ "a gimmick, such as a crystal ball, tarot cards, or palm reading", if they are alert to the clues provided about their clients by such details as their "clothing, jewelry, mannerisms, and speech", if they are not afraid of "hamming it up", and if they use flattery.

Michael Birnbaum, a professor of psychology at California State University, Fullerton, has noted that the Forer effect is used by magicians and psychics when they give "cold readings", as well as by certain TV personalities who claim psychoanalytical expertise and profess to be able to diagnose a guest's psychological problems in a few minutes. "Real psychologists are horrified by this practice", states Birnbaum, but they fail to criticize it vigorously enough in public, and so it continues to be treated with a respect it doesn't deserve. "It is regrettable that academic psychology has not paid more attention to the cold reading technique", Denis Dutton wrote in 1988, "in as much as the widespread practice of successful cold reading forms the basis for much of the belief in paranormal powers to be found in society today." While academic psychologists had focused in their studies on students, Dutton called for "analysis of the actual techniques and methods used by proficient cold readers".

"The moral of the Barnum demonstration", Birnbaum has said, is that "self-validation is no validation. Do not be fooled by a psychic, quack psychotherapist, or a phony faith healer who uses this trick on you! Be skeptical and ask for proof. Keep your money in your wallet, your wallet in your pocket, and your hand on your wallet."

== See also ==
- Apophenia
- Confirmation bias
- Hawthorne effect
- List of cognitive biases
- Law of truly large numbers
- Myers–Briggs Type Indicator § Accuracy and validity
- Placebo
- Thinking, Fast and Slow
