= Synchronicity =

Jungian concept of the meaningfulness of acausal coincidences

Synchronicity (German: Synchronizität) is a concept introduced by Carl Jung, founder of analytical psychology, to describe events that coincide in time and appear meaningfully related, yet lack a discoverable causal connection. Jung held that this was a healthy function of the mind, although it can become harmful within psychosis.

Jung developed the theory as a hypothetical noncausal principle serving as the intersubjective or philosophically objective connection between these seemingly meaningful coincidences. After coining the term in the late 1920s Jung developed the concept with physicist Wolfgang Pauli through correspondence and in their 1952 work The Interpretation of Nature and the Psyche. This culminated in the Pauli–Jung conjecture. Jung and Pauli's view was that, just as causal connections can provide a meaningful understanding of the psyche and the world, so too may acausal connections.

A 2016 study found 70% of therapists agreed synchronicity experiences could be useful for therapy. Analytical psychologists hold that individuals must understand the compensatory meaning of these experiences to "enhance consciousness rather than merely build up superstitiousness". However, clients who disclose synchronicity experiences report not being listened to, accepted, or understood. The experience of overabundance of meaningful coincidences can be characteristic of schizophrenic delusion. Similar experiences not indicative of schizophrenia can result from intensive magical thinking driven by severe presentations of obsessive–compulsive disorder (OCD).

Jung used synchronicity in arguing for the existence of the paranormal. This idea was explored by Arthur Koestler in The Roots of Coincidence and taken up by the New Age movement. Unlike magical thinking, which believes causally unrelated events to have paranormal causal connection, synchronicity supposes events may be causally unrelated yet have unknown noncausal connection.

The objection from a scientific standpoint is that this is neither testable nor falsifiable, so does not fall within empirical study. Scientific scepticism regards it as pseudoscience. Jung stated that synchronicity events are chance occurrences from a statistical point of view, but meaningful in that they may seem to validate paranormal ideas. No empirical studies of synchronicity based on observable mental states and scientific data were conducted by Jung to draw his conclusions, though studies have since been done. While someone may experience a coincidence as meaningful, this alone cannot prove objective meaning to the coincidence.

Statistical laws or probability, show how unexpected occurrences can be inevitable or more likely encountered than people assume. These explain coincidences such as synchronicity experiences as chance events which have been misinterpreted by confirmation biases, spurious correlations, or underestimated probability.

== Origins ==
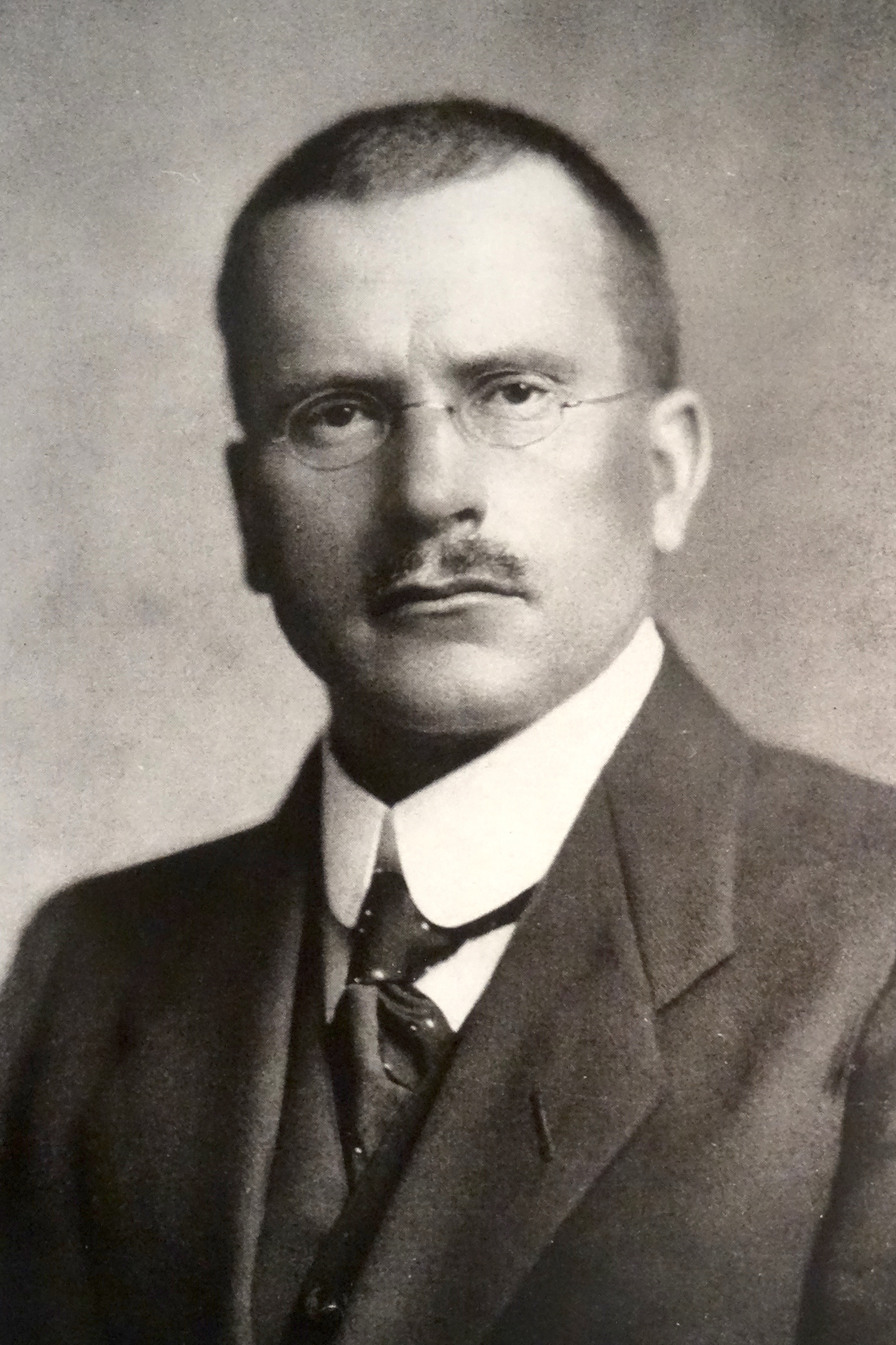
Carl G. Jung, who coined the term synchronicity between 1928 and 1930

Synchronicity arose with Jung's use of the ancient Chinese divination text I Ching. It has 64 hexagrams, each built from two trigrams or bagua. A divination is made by seemingly random numerical happenings for which the I Ching text gives detailed situational analysis. Richard Wilhelm, translator of Chinese, provided Jung with validation. Jung met Wilhelm in Darmstadt, Germany where Hermann von Keyserling hosted Gesellschaft für Freie Philosophie. In 1923 Wilhelm was in Zurich, as was Jung, attending the psychology club, where Wilhelm promulgated the I Ching. Finally,

I Ching was published with Wilhelm's commentary. I instantly obtained the book and found to my gratification that Wilhelm took much the same view of the meaningful connections as I had. But he knew the entire literature and could therefore fill in the gaps which had been outside my competence.

— Aniela Jaffé (1962), Memories, Dreams, Reflections of C. G. Jung, page 374

Jung coined the term synchronicity as part of a lecture in May 1930, or as early as 1928, at first for use in discussing Chinese religious and philosophical concepts. His first public articulation of the term came in 1930 at the memorial address for Richard Wilhelm where Jung stated:

The science [i.e. cleromancy] of the I Ching is based not on the causality principle but on one which—hitherto unnamed because not familiar to us—I have tentatively called the synchronistic principle.

The I Ching is one of the five classics of Confucianism. By selecting a passage according to the traditional chance operations such as tossing coins and counting out yarrow stalks, the text is supposed to give insights into a person's inner states. Jung characterised this as the belief in synchronicity, and himself believed the text to give apt readings in his own experiences. He would later also recommend this practice to certain of his patients. Jung argued that synchronicity could be found diffused throughout Chinese philosophy more broadly and in various Taoist concepts. Jung also drew heavily from German philosophers Gottfried Leibniz, whose own exposure to I Ching divination in the 17th century was the primary precursor to the theory of synchronicity in the West, Arthur Schopenhauer, whom Jung placed alongside Leibniz as the two philosophers most influential to his formulation of the concept, and Johannes Kepler. He points to Schopenhauer, especially, as providing an early conception of synchronicity in the quote:

All the events in a man's life would accordingly stand in two fundamentally different kinds of connection: firstly, in the objective, causal connection of the natural process; secondly, in a subjective connection which exists only in relation to the individual who experiences it, and which is thus as subjective as his own dreams[.]

— Arthur Schopenhauer, "Transcendent Speculation on the Apparent Deliberateness in the Fate of the Individual", Parerga and Paralipomena (1851), Volume 1, Chapter 4, trans. E. F. J. Payne

As with Paul Kammerer's theory of seriality developed in the late 1910s, Jung looked to hidden structures of nature for an explanation of coincidences. In 1932, physicist Wolfgang Pauli and Jung began what would become an extended correspondence in which they discussed and collaborated on various topics surrounding synchronicity, contemporary science, and what is now known as the Pauli effect. Jung also built heavily upon the idea of numinosity, a concept originating in the work of German religious scholar Rudolf Otto, which describes the feeling of gravitas found in religious experiences, and which perhaps brought greatest criticism upon Jung's theory. Jung also drew from parapsychologist J. B. Rhine whose work in the 1930s had at the time appeared to validate certain claims about extrasensory perception. It was not until a 1951 Eranos conference lecture, after having gradually developed the concept for over two decades, that Jung gave his first major outline of synchronicity. The following year, Jung and Pauli published their 1952 work The Interpretation of Nature and the Psyche (German: Naturerklärung und Psyche), which contained Jung's central monograph on the subject, "Synchronicity: An Acausal Connecting Principle".

Other notable influences and precursors to synchronicity can be found in: the theological concept of correspondences, sympathetic magic, astrology, and alchemy.

=== Pauli–Jung conjecture ===
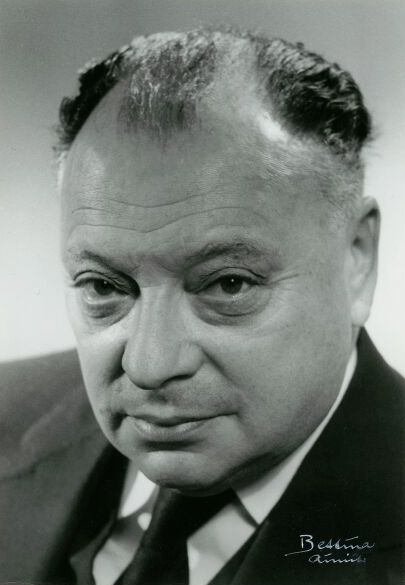
Wolfgang Pauli

The Pauli–Jung conjecture is a collaboration in metatheory between physicist Wolfgang Pauli and analytical psychologist Carl Jung, centered on the concept of synchronicity. It was mainly developed between 1946 and 1954, four years before Pauli's death, and speculates on a double-aspect perspective within the disciplines of both collaborators. Pauli additionally drew on various elements of quantum theory such as complementarity, nonlocality, and the observer effect in his contributions to the project. Jung and Pauli thereby "offered the radical [...] idea that the currency of these correlations is not (quantitative) statistics, as in quantum physics, but (qualitative) meaning".

Contemporary physicist T. Filk writes that quantum entanglement, being "a particular type of acausal quantum correlations", was plausibly taken by Pauli as "a model for the relationship between mind and matter in the framework [...] he proposed together with Jung". Specifically, quantum entanglement may be the physical phenomenon which most closely represents the concept of synchronicity.

== Analytical psychology ==
In analytical psychology, the recognition of seemingly-meaningful coincidences is a mechanism by which unconscious material is brought to the attention of the conscious mind. A harmful or developmental outcome can then result only from the individual's response to such material. Jung proposed that the concept could have psychiatric use in mitigating the negative effects of over-rationalisation and proclivities towards mind–body dualism.

Analytical psychology considers modern modes of thought to rest upon the pre-modern and primordial structures of the psyche. Causal connections thus form the basis of modern worldviews, and connections which lack causal reasoning are seen as chance. This chance-based interpretation, however, is incongruent with the primordial mind, which instead interprets this category as intention. The primordial framework in fact places emphasis on these connections, just as the modern framework emphasizes causal ones. In this regard, causality, like synchronicity, is a human interpretation imposed onto external phenomena. Primordial modes of thought are however, according to Jung, necessary constituents of the modern psyche that inevitably protrude into modern life—providing the basis for meaningful interpretation of the world by way of meaning-based connections. Just as the principles of psychological causality provide meaningful understanding of causal connections, so too the principle of synchronicity attempts to provide meaningful understanding of acausal connections. Jung placed synchronicity as one of three main conceptual elements in understanding the psyche:

1. Psychological causality, as understood in Freudian theory, by which repressed libidinal energy is discharged across the psyche in response to principles of cause and effect—though Jung broadened this to a more generalized mental energy that is "particular to the unfolding of the individual psyche"
2. Psychological teleology, by which self-actualisation is an element of the psyche as potential
3. Psychological synchronicity, or meaningful chance, by which the potential for self-actualisation is either enhanced or negated

Jung felt synchronicity to be a principle that had explanatory power towards his concepts of archetypes and the collective unconscious. (Note: Archetypes and the Collective Unconscious: Jung defines the 'collective unconscious' as akin to instincts.) It described a governing dynamic which underlies the whole of human experience and history—social, emotional, psychological, and spiritual. The emergence of the synchronistic paradigm was a significant move away from Cartesian dualism towards an underlying philosophy of double-aspect theory. Some argue this shift was essential in bringing theoretical coherence to Jung's earlier work. (Note: In the final two pages of the Conclusion to Synchronicity, Jung states that not all coincidences are meaningful and further explains the creative causes of this phenomenon.)

== Philosophy of science ==
Jung held that there was both a philosophical and scientific basis for synchronicity. He identified the complementary nature of causality and acausality with Eastern sciences and protoscientific disciplines, stating "the East bases much of its science on this irregularity and considers coincidences as the reliable basis of the world rather than causality. Synchronism is the prejudice of the East; causality is the modern prejudice of the West" (see also: universal causation). Contemporary scholar L. K. Kerr writes:

Jung also looked to modern physics to understand the nature of synchronicity, and attempted to adapt many ideas in this field to accommodate his conception of synchronicity, including the property of numinosity. He worked closely with Nobel Prize winning physicist Wolfgang Pauli and also consulted with Albert Einstein. The notion of synchronicity shares with modern physics the idea that under certain conditions, the laws governing the interactions of space and time can no longer be understood according to the principle of causality. In this regard, Jung joined modern physicists in reducing the conditions in which the laws of classical mechanics apply.

It is also pointed out that, since Jung took into consideration only the narrow definition of causality—only the efficient cause—his notion of acausality is also narrow and so is not applicable to final and formal causes as understood in Aristotelian or Thomist systems. Either the final causality is inherent in synchronicity, as it leads to individuation; or synchronicity can be a kind of replacement for final causality. However, such finalism or teleology is considered to be outside the domain of modern science.

Jung's theory, and philosophical worldview implicated by it, includes not only mainstream science thoughts but also esoteric ones and ones that are against mainstream.

== Paranormal ==
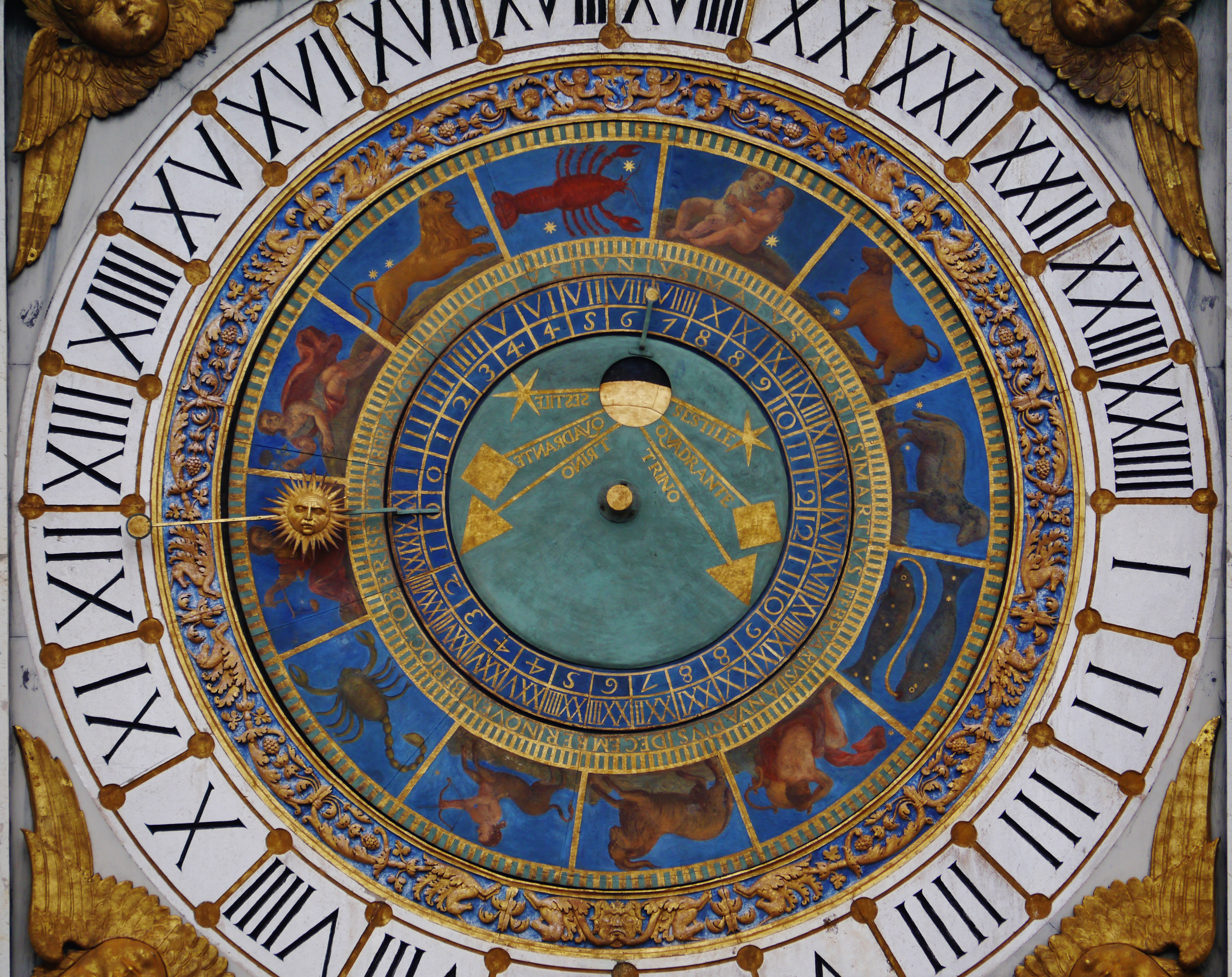
Astral configurations in astrology represent for Jung an example of synchronicity, that is, of a parallel, non-causal relationship between the development of celestial phenomena and those marked by terrestrial time.

Jung's use of the concept in arguing for the existence of paranormal phenomena has been widely considered pseudoscientific by modern scientific scepticism. Furthermore, his collaborator Wolfgang Pauli objected to his dubious experiments of the concept involving astrology—which Jung believed to be supported by the laboratory experiments behind the uncertainty principle's formulation. Jung similarly turned to the works of parapsychologist Joseph B. Rhine to support a connection between synchronicity and the paranormal. In his book Synchronicity: An Acausal Connecting Principle, Jung wrote:

How are we to recognize acausal combinations of events, since it is obviously impossible to examine all chance happenings for their causality? The answer to this is that acausal events may be expected most readily where, on closer reflection, a causal connection appears to be inconceivable. It is impossible, with our present resources, to explain ESP [extrasensory perception], or the fact of meaningful coincidence, as a phenomenon of energy. This makes an end of the causal explanation as well, for "effect" cannot be understood as anything except a phenomenon of energy. Therefore it cannot be a question of cause and effect, but of a falling together in time, a kind of simultaneity. Because of this quality of simultaneity, I have picked on the term "synchronicity" to designate a hypothetical factor equal in rank to causality as a principle of explanation.

Roderick Main, in the introduction to his 1997 book Jung on Synchronicity and the Paranormal, wrote:

The culmination of Jung's lifelong engagement with the paranormal is his theory of synchronicity, the view that the structure of reality includes a principle of acausal connection which manifests itself most conspicuously in the form of meaningful coincidences. Difficult, flawed, prone to misrepresentation, this theory none the less remains one of the most suggestive attempts yet made to bring the paranormal within the bounds of intelligibility. It has been found relevant by psychotherapists, parapsychologists, researchers of spiritual experience and a growing number of non-specialists. Indeed, Jung's writings in this area form an excellent general introduction to the whole field of the paranormal.

== Studies ==
- A 1989 overview of research areas and methodology in the study of coincidence published by the Journal of the American Statistical Association addresses various potentials in researching synchronicity experiences.
- A 2009 paper found that, clinically, synchronicity experiences seem to cluster around periods of emotional intensity or major life transitions, such as births, deaths, and marriage.
- A 2016 study found that clients who have disclosed synchronicity experiences in clinical setting often report not being listened to, accepted, or understood. The study also found that for therapists these experiences often come as a shock and a challenge to their own worldviews, prompting researchers to specify a need to provide accurate and reliable information about synchronicity experiences for mental health professionals.
- Another 2016 study of 226 therapists found that 44% reported synchronicity experiences in the therapeutic setting, and 67% felt that synchronicity experiences could be useful for therapy. The study also points out ways of explanations of synchronicity:
  For example, psychologists were significantly more likely than both counsellors and psychotherapists to agree that chance coincidence was an explanation for synchronicity, whereas, counsellors and psychotherapists were significantly more likely than psychologists to agree that a need for unconscious material to be expressed could be an explanation for synchronicity experiences in the clinical setting.
- A 2018 study shows that the concept of synchronicity finds clinical application in psychotherapies in form of a Jungian-specific approach to interpretation. Already the conceptual idea of synchronicity offers the therapist an additional therapeutic tool to put potentially meaningful experienced coincidences between him and the patient into a subjective narrative, which can be experienced by the patient as meaningful. If a synchronistic moment is sensitively recognized, thematized and interpreted as such, it can have positive consequences for the therapeutic relationship and therapy.

== Scientific reception ==
Since their inception, Jung's theories of synchronicity have been highly controversial and have never had widespread scientific approval. Scientific scepticism regards them as pseudoscience. Likewise, mainstream science does not support paranormal explanations of coincidences.

Despite this, synchronicity experiences and the synchronicity principle continue to be studied within philosophy, cognitive science, and analytical psychology. Synchronicity is widely challenged by the sufficiency of probability theory in explaining the occurrence of coincidences, the relationship between synchronicity experiences and cognitive biases, and doubts about the theory's psychiatric or scientific usefulness.

Psychologist Fritz Levi, a contemporary of Jung, criticised the theory in his 1952 review, published in the periodical Neue Schweizer Rundschau (New Swiss Observations). Levi saw Jung's theory as vague in determinability of synchronistic events, saying that Jung never specifically explained his rejection of "magic causality" to which such an acausal principle as synchronicity would be related. He also questioned the theory's usefulness.

In a 1981 paper, parapsychologist Charles Tart writes:

[There is] a danger inherent in the concept of synchronicity. This danger is the temptation to mental laziness. If, in working with paranormal phenomena, I cannot get my experiments to replicate and cannot find any patterns in the results, then, as attached as I am to the idea of causality, it would be very tempting to say, "Well, it's synchronistic, it's forever beyond my understanding," and so (prematurely) give up trying to find a causal explanation. Sloppy use of the concept of synchronicity then becomes a way of being intellectually lazy and dodging our responsibilities.

Robert Todd Carroll, author of The Skeptic's Dictionary in 2003, argues that synchronicity experiences are better explained as apophenia—the tendency for humans to find significance or meaning where none exists. He states that over a person's lifetime one can be expected to encounter several seemingly-unpredictable coincidences and that there is no need for Jung's metaphysical explanation of these occurrences.

In a 2014 interview, emeritus professor and statistician David J. Hand states:

Synchronicity is an attempt to come up with an explanation for the occurrence of highly improbable coincidences between events where there is no causal link. It's based on the premise that existing physics and mathematics cannot explain such things. This is wrong, however—standard science can explain them. That's really the point of the improbability principle. What I have tried to do is pull out and make explicit how physics and mathematics, in the form of probability calculus does explain why such striking and apparently highly improbable events happen. There's no need to conjure up other forces or ideas, and there's no need to attribute mystical meaning or significance to their occurrence. In fact, we should expect them to happen, as they do, purely in the natural course of events.

In a 2015 paper, scholars M. K. Johansen and M. Osman state:

As theories, the main problem with both synchronicity and seriality is that they ignore the possibility that coincidences are a psychological phenomenon and focus instead on the premise that coincidences are examples of actual but hidden structures in the world.

== Examples ==
=== Jung ===
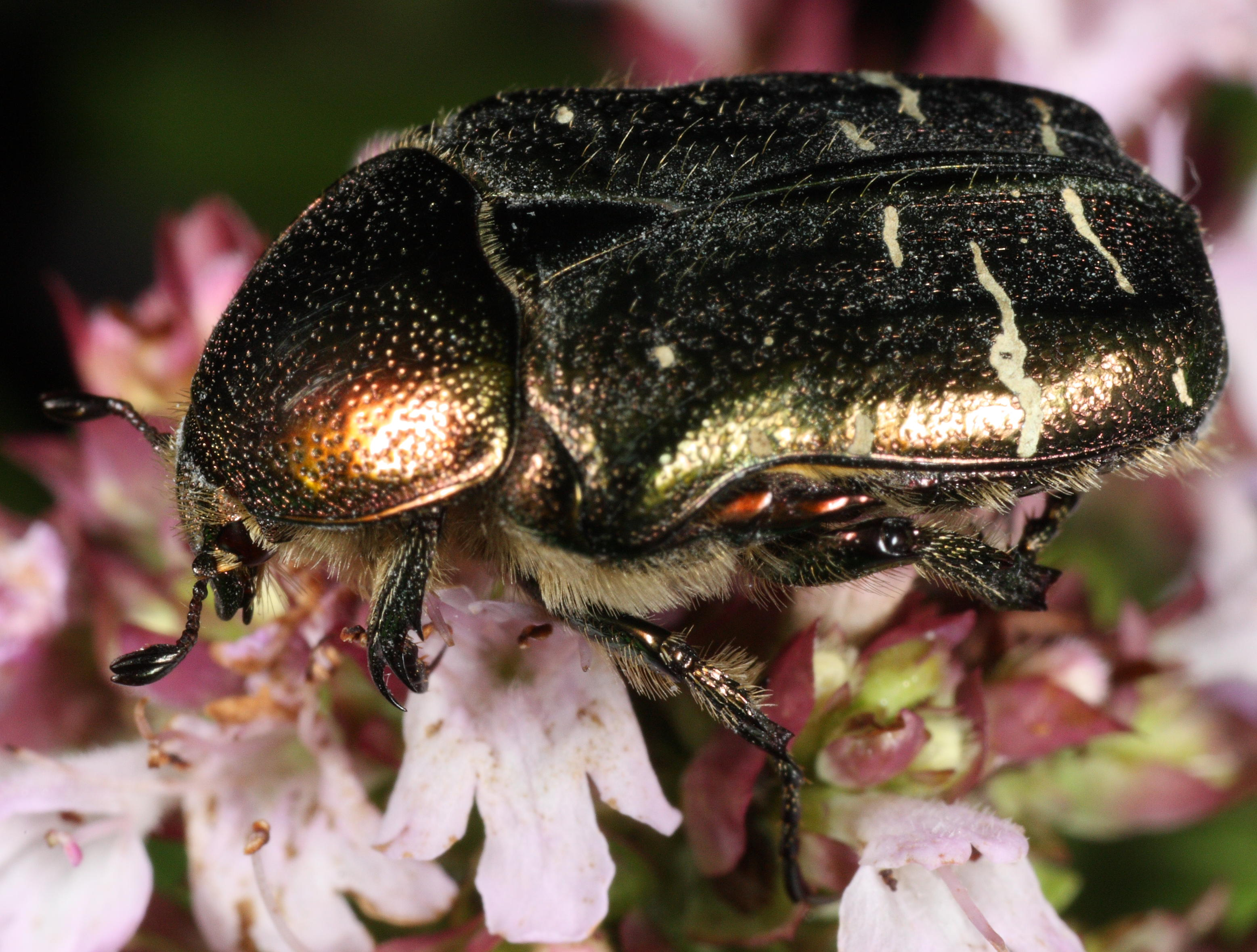
A gold-coloured Cetonia aurata

Jung tells the following story as an example of a synchronistic event in his 1960 book Synchronicity:

By way of example, I shall mention an incident from my own observation. A young woman I was treating had, at a critical moment, a dream in which she was given a golden scarab. While she was telling me this dream I sat with my back to the closed window. Suddenly I heard a noise behind me, like a gentle tapping. I turned round and saw a flying insect knocking against the window pane from outside. I opened the window and caught the creature in the air as it flew in. It was the nearest analogy to a golden scarab that one finds in our latitudes, a scarabaeid beetle, the common rose-chafer (Cetonia aurata), which contrary to its usual habits had evidently felt an urge to get into a dark room at this particular moment.

It was an extraordinarily difficult case to treat, and up to the time of the dream little or no progress had been made. I should explain that the main reason for this was my patient's animus, which was steeped in Cartesian philosophy and clung so rigidly to its own idea of reality that the efforts of three doctors—I was the third—had not been able to weaken it. Evidently something quite irrational was needed which was beyond my powers to produce. The dream alone was enough to disturb ever so slightly the rationalistic attitude of my patient. But when the "scarab" came flying in through the window in actual fact, her natural being could burst through the armor of her animus possession and the process of transformation could at last begin to move.

After describing some examples, Jung wrote: "When coincidences pile up in this way, one cannot help being impressed by them—for the greater the number of terms in such a series, or the more unusual its character, the more improbable it becomes."

=== Deschamps ===
French writer Émile Deschamps claims in his memoirs that, in 1805, he was treated to some plum pudding by a stranger named Monsieur de Fontgibu. Ten years later, the writer encountered plum pudding on the menu of a Paris restaurant and wanted to order some, but the waiter told him that the last dish had already been served to another customer, who turned out to be de Fontgibu. Many years later, in 1832, Deschamps was at a dinner and once again ordered plum pudding. He recalled the earlier incident and told his friends that only de Fontgibu was missing to make the setting complete—and in the same instant, the now-senile de Fontgibu entered the room, having got the wrong address.

=== Pauli ===
In his book Thirty Years That Shook Physics: The Story of Quantum Theory (1966), George Gamow writes about Wolfgang Pauli, who was apparently considered a person particularly associated with synchronicity events. Gamow whimsically refers to the "Pauli effect", a mysterious phenomenon which is not understood on a purely materialistic basis, and probably never will be. The following anecdote is told:

It is well known that theoretical physicists cannot handle experimental equipment; it breaks whenever they touch it. Pauli was such a good theoretical physicist that something usually broke in the lab whenever he merely stepped across the threshold. A mysterious event that did not seem at first to be connected with Pauli's presence once occurred in Professor J. Franck's laboratory in Göttingen. Early one afternoon, without apparent cause, a complicated apparatus for the study of atomic phenomena collapsed. Franck wrote humorously about this to Pauli at his Zürich address and, after some delay, received an answer in an envelope with a Danish stamp. Pauli wrote that he had gone to visit Bohr and at the time of the mishap in Franck's laboratory his train was stopped for a few minutes at the Göttingen railroad station. You may believe this anecdote or not, but there are many other observations concerning the reality of the Pauli Effect!

== In popular culture ==
Philip K. Dick makes reference to "Pauli's synchronicity" in his 1963 science-fiction novel, The Game-Players of Titan, in reference to pre-cognitive psionic abilities being interfered with by other psionic abilities such as psychokinesis: "an acausal connective event".

In 1983 The Police released an album titled Synchronicity, inspired by Arthur Koestler's discussion of synchronicity in his book The Roots of Coincidence. A song from the album, "Synchronicity II", simultaneously describes the story of a man experiencing a mental breakdown and a lurking monster emerging from a Scottish lake.

Björk wrote a song titled "Synchronicity" for Spike Jonze's Hot Chocolate DVD.

Rising Appalachia released a song titled "Synchronicity" on their 2015 album Wider Circles.

== See also ==
- Correlation does not imply causation – Refutation of a logical fallacy
- Ideas and delusions of reference – Phenomenon involving innocuous events
- Look-elsewhere effect – Statistical analysis phenomenon
- Post hoc ergo propter hoc – Fallacy of assumption of causation based on sequence of events
- Synchromysticism – Belief system attributing meaning to coincidences
- Yuanfen – Concept in Chinese culture
