= Bertram Forer =

American psychologist (1914–2000)

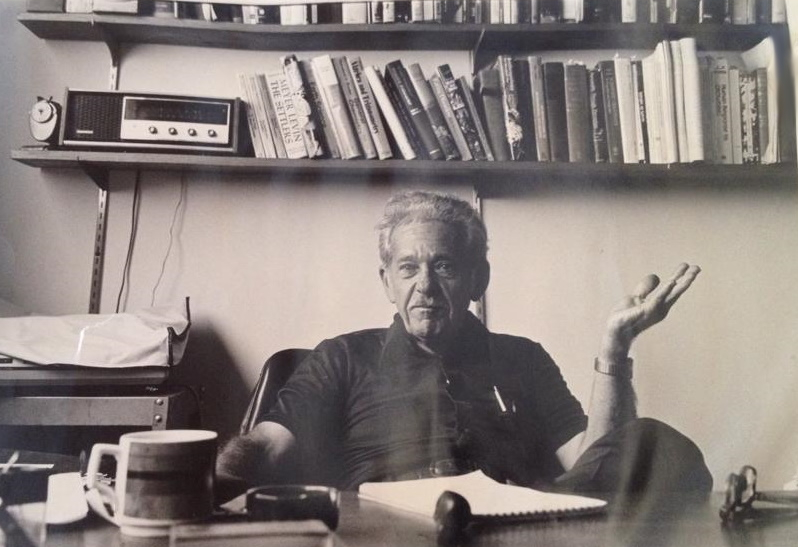
- Born: Bertram Robin Forer; 24 October 1914; Springfield, Massachusetts
- Died: 6 April 2000 (aged 85); Ventura, California
- Education: University of Massachusetts Amherst; University of California, Los Angeles (MA, PhD)
- Known for: Barnum effect

Bertram R. Forer (24 October 1914 – 6 April 2000) was an American psychologist best known for describing the Forer effect, sometimes referred to as subjective validation.

== Early life ==
Born in Springfield, Massachusetts, Forer graduated from University of Massachusetts Amherst in 1936. He received his M.A. and Ph.D. in clinical psychology from University of California, Los Angeles.

== Career ==
Forer served as a psychologist and administrator in a military hospital in France during World War II. Upon return he worked in a Veterans Administration mental clinic in Los Angeles; and in private practice in Malibu, California.

In his classic 1948 experiment, Forer administered a personality test to his students. Rather than scoring the tests and giving individual assessments, he gave all the students exactly the same analysis copied from a newspaper astrology column. The students were then asked to evaluate the description on a scale of zero through five, with five being the most accurate. The average evaluation was 4.26.

The experiment has been repeated hundreds of times since 1948, and the average remains about 4.2.

The "Forer effect", sometimes known as the Barnum effect, shows that people tend to accept generalised descriptions of their personalities without realising that the same evaluation could apply to nearly anyone else, because people want the results to be true. This experiment is frequently cited in criticisms of other personality tests like the Myers-Briggs Type Indicator.

== Family ==
Bertram Forer was married to Lucille Kremith Forer, best known as the main author of the book "The Birth Order Factor". They have two sons.
