= Coincidance =

1988 American non-fiction book by Robert Anton Wilson

Coincidance: A Head Test
- Author: Robert Anton Wilson
- Language: English
- Subject: Consciousness, linguistics
- Publisher: New Falcon Publications
- Publication date: 1988
- Publication place: United States
- Pages: 258
- ISBN: 1-56184-004-1

Coincidance: A Head Test is a book by Robert Anton Wilson, published in 1988 in the United States. It consists of series of essays in four parts prefaced by a foreword from the author. It covers familiar Wilson territory such as the writings of James Joyce, Carl Jung, linguistics, and coincidence.

As explained on the back cover the title is a deliberate misspelling suggesting the "mad dervish whirl of coincidence and synchronicity" to be found within.

== See also ==
- Synchronicity: An Acausal Connecting Principle, 1960 book by Carl Gustav Jung
- The Roots of Coincidence, 1972 book by Arthur Koestler
