= Littlewood's law =

Statistical law

Littlewood's law states that a person can expect to experience events with odds of one in a million (referred to as a "miracle") at the rate of about one per month. It is named after the British mathematician John Edensor Littlewood.

It seeks, among other things, to debunk one element of supposed supernatural phenomenology and is related to the more general law of truly large numbers, which states that with a sample size large enough, any outrageous (in terms of probability model of single sample) thing is likely to happen.

== History ==
An early formulation of the law appears in the 1953 collection of Littlewood's work, A Mathematician's Miscellany. In the chapter "Large Numbers", Littlewood states:

Improbabilities are apt to be overestimated. It is true that I should have been surprised in the past to learn that Professor Hardy [an atheist] had joined the Oxford Group [a Christian organization]. But one could not say the adverse chance was 10^{6} : 1. Mathematics is a dangerous profession; an appreciable proportion of us go mad, and then this particular event would be quite likely. [...] I sometimes ask the question: what is the most remarkable coincidence you have experienced, and is it, for the most remarkable one, remarkable? (With a lifetime to choose from, 10^{6} : 1 is a mere trifle.)

Littlewood uses these remarks to illustrate that seemingly unlikely coincidences can be expected over long periods. He provides several anecdotes about improbable events that, given enough time, are likely to occur. For example, in the game of bridge, the probability that a player will be dealt 13 cards of the same suit is extremely low (Littlewood calculates it as $2.4 \cdot 10^{-9}$). While such a deal might seem miraculous, if one estimates that $2 \cdot 10^6$ people in England each play an average of 30 bridge hands a week, it becomes quite expected that such a "miracle" would happen approximately once per year.

This statement was later reformulated as Littlewood's law of miracles by Freeman Dyson, in a 2004 review of the book Debunked! ESP, Telekinesis, and Other Pseudoscience, published in the New York Review of Books:

The paradoxical feature of the laws of probability is that they make unlikely events happen unexpectedly often. A simple way to state the paradox is Littlewood’s law of miracles. John Littlewood [...] defined a miracle as an event that has special importance when it occurs, but occurs with a probability of one in a million. This definition agrees with our commonsense understanding of the word “miracle.”
Littlewood’s law of miracles states that in the course of any normal person’s life, miracles happen at a rate of roughly one per month. The proof of the law is simple. During the time that we are awake and actively engaged in living our lives, roughly for 8 hours each day, we see and hear things happening at a rate of about one per second. So the total number of events that happen to us is about 30,000 per day, or about a million per month. With few exceptions, these events are not miracles because they are insignificant. The chance of a miracle is about one per million events. Therefore we should expect about one miracle to happen, on the average, every month.

== See also ==
- Coincidence
- Confirmation bias
- Gambler's fallacy
- List of eponymous laws
- Micromort
- Orders of magnitude (probability)
- Spurious relationship
- Synchronicity
