= Paul Kammerer =

Austrian biologist (1880–1926)

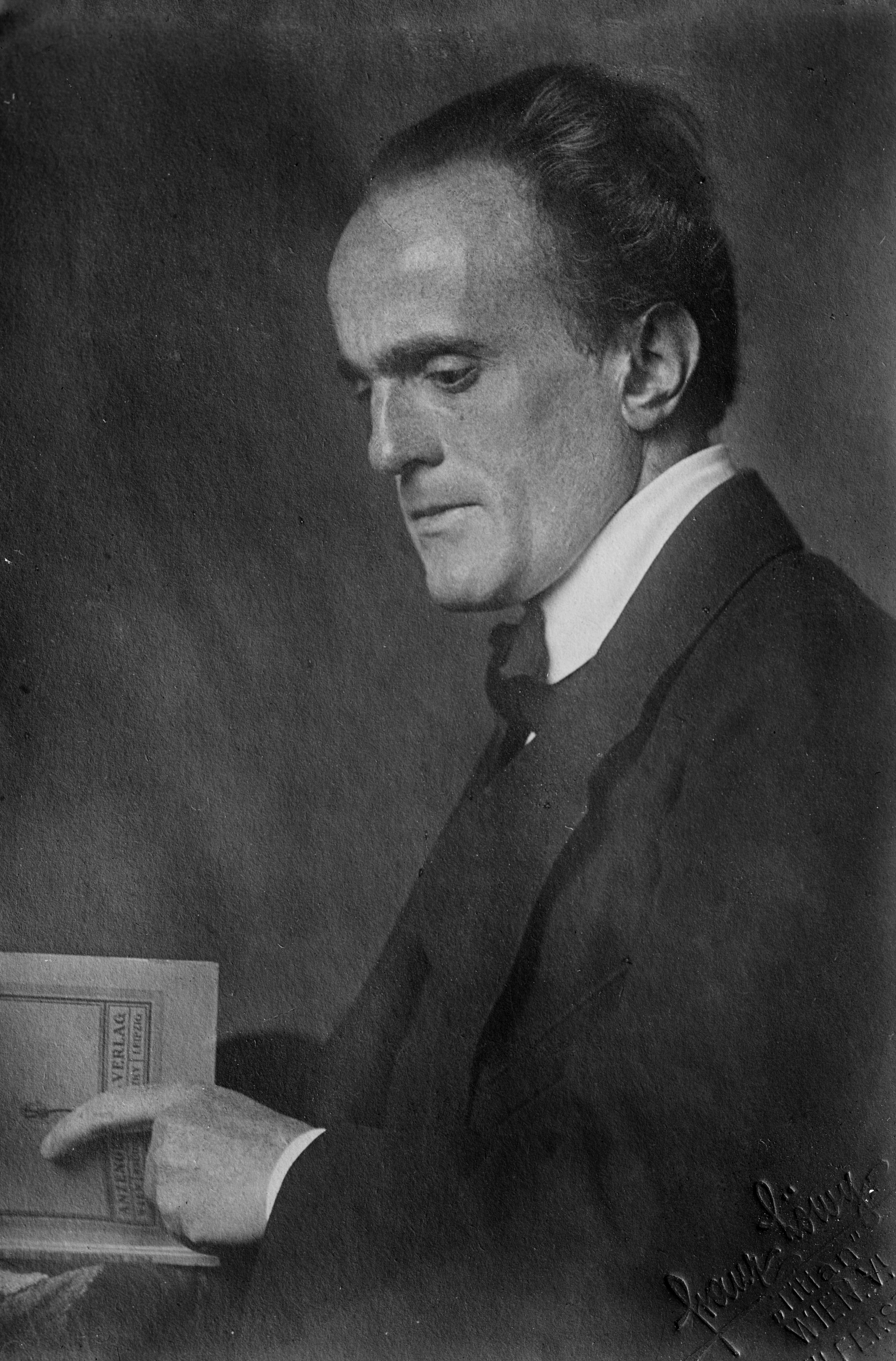
- Paul Kammerer, 1924
- Born: 17 August 1880; Vienna
- Died: 23 September 1926 (aged 46); Puchberg am Schneeberg
- Known for: Lamarckism, herpetological research

Paul Kammerer (17 August 1880, in Vienna – 23 September 1926, in Puchberg am Schneeberg) was an Austrian biologist who studied evolutionary theory through the medium of investigation of the reproduction and development of amphibians. Although he is now known for advocating a form of Lamarckism, the theory that organisms may pass to their offspring characteristics acquired in their lifetime, meaning variation would be directed towards creating adaptations, he considered himself a Darwinian in the fashion of Ernst Haeckel.

== Biography ==
=== Education ===
Kammerer's father was a Viennese factory owner. Little is known about his mother except that she had Jewish heritage. He began his academic career at the Vienna Academy by studying music but graduated with a degree in biology. He went on to work under Hans Przibram, a professor of experimental zoology at the University of Vienna, at Przibram's newly created Institute for Experimental Biology (Biologische Versuchsanstalt).

=== Biological research ===
Kammerer's work in biology largely involved breeding and development of amphibians, with a focus on investigating how alterations in the environment in which various salamanders and toads lived or mated would affect their offspring's characteristics. He supported the Lamarckian theory of heritability of acquired characteristics, and he experimented extensively in an effort to prove the theory.

Fire Salamanders and Alpine Salamanders

In his experiments with salamanders, he addressed two characteristics: first, whether the salamander reproduced viviparously or ovoviviparously, and second, whether the salamander was all black, or whether it was black with yellow stripes or spots.

The brightly colored European fire salamander (Salamandra salamandra or Salamandra maculosa) is a species that reproduces larviparously, meaning that while fertilization takes place externally, the female then draws the egg mass into her body, where they develop for a time, and then she gives birth to larval forms that have external gills and require water to survive until further metamorphosis. The alpine salamander (Salamandra atra), by contrast, is a species that gives birth to live young, with no external gills, that do not require immersion in water to survive, and can walk on land without further metamorphosis. The number of offspring is also much smaller than that of a typical fire salamander clutch, and the embryos will often consume other yolks or even sibling embryos while gestating. It is also typically all black, instead of having yellow stripes or spots.

Kammerer claimed that by depriving fire salamander females of water in which to give birth, he had induced the salamanders to gestate their larvae internally for a longer period of time, so that the metamorphosis from aquatic to terrestrial characteristics took place during gestation, similar to how alpine salamanders reproduce. Conversely, by forcing high-altitude, dry land-adapted alpine salamanders to reproduce in water, Kammerer reported that he induced alpine salamander females to give birth to pre-metamorphic aquatic larvae with gills, and that this change in phenotype was inherited by subsequent generations.

Kammerer's experiments regarding the coloration of fire salamanders were based on his assumption that the yellow-and-black coloration was a protective camouflage adaptation. (Today, scientists mostly believe that the fire salamander's bright yellow markings are aposematic, that is, they serve to warn predators of their venomous glands.) Kammerer raised yellow-spotted or striped fire salamanders on dark-colored substrates, and claimed that the offspring of these salamanders had smaller yellow markings than their parents, and that these markings continued to shrink as they developed. He also bred melanistic alpine salamanders on yellow-colored soil and said that their offspring developed yellow spots or stripes, which also increased in size as the individuals matured.

Olms

Kammerer also manipulated and bred olms (Proteus anguinus), which are pale, blind, neotenic, cave-dwelling salamanders whose life cycles were poorly understood at the time of his research. The only prior research on olms to that date had been done by Marie von Chauvin, who had carefully bred and observed the mating habits of olms during the 1880s. According to von Chauvin, olms were oviparous, laying individual eggs in rock depressions after mating in cold water. Kammerer, by his own account, never directly observed an olm giving birth to live young. Rather, he kept several olms together in a large tank, where he fed them sporadically. He then isolated a single female olm, and when two smaller olms later appeared in her tank, he chalked this up to the female having given birth. While his methodology casts doubt on his results, it is his claim that his olms reproduced on an annual basis, juxtaposed with the subsequent discovery of the olm's extraordinarily long life span (average of 68 years) and the fact that female olms require upwards of 12 years to reach sexual maturity, that most strongly suggests Kammerer's results on this subject were fraudulent.

Kammerer's other experiments with olms involved his efforts to get their skin to darken and their eyes to become functional by exposing them to light. He was successful in inducing pigmentation by exposing the olms to light, and other scientists have confirmed this effect. Kammerer also maintained that olms kept alternately in daylight and red light not only developed darker skin, but also larger, functional eyes, even though he had to surgically remove the skin covering his specimens' eyes.

Midwife Toads

Kammerer's most well-known and most controversial experiments involved the reproductive habits of midwife toads (Alytes obstetricians). Unlike most toad species, midwife toads mate on land. After fertilizing the eggs, the male toad takes them up onto his hind legs and carries them around for up to eight weeks, while the eggs develop into tadpoles, at which point the male enters a body of water and the eggs burst, releasing the tadpoles. Toads which mate in water typically have nuptial pads on their digits to help them clasp the slippery body of a breeding female. Male midwife toads, who mate on land, lack these rough, dark-colored pads. Kammerer forced the toads to breed in water by increasing the temperature of their tanks, forcing them to retreat to the water to cool off. He reported that this caused the females to lay their eggs directly in the water, rather than on land, and that the male toads would not brood the eggs, instead letting them float free. This, however, also came with a high mortality rate of the eggs. Kammerer reported that toads that hatched from the few remaining specimens also tended to mate in water and the males did not brood them even if they mated on land. He also claimed that the male toads descended from this experimental population developed nuptial pads.

While the prehistoric ancestors of midwife toads had the pads, Kammerer considered the pads to be an acquired characteristic brought about by adaptation to environment.

==== Accusations of fraud ====
Claims arose that the result of the toad experiment had been falsified. The most notable of these was made by Dr Gladwyn Kingsley Noble, Curator of Reptiles at the American Museum of Natural History, in the scientific journal Nature. After a microscopic examination, Noble claimed that the black pads actually had a far more mundane explanation: they had simply been injected with India ink.

In a letter, Kammerer stated that after reading Noble's paper, he re-examined his specimen and confirmed that India ink had been injected into the pads. Kammerer suggested that his specimens had been altered by a laboratory assistant. Criminologist Edward Sagarin wrote, "Kammerer maintained his total innocence and declared his ignorance of the forger's identity. There is still doubt about whether an obliging (or hostile) assistant was responsible for the forgery, but Kammerer's scientific credibility was nevertheless irremediably damaged".

Science historian Peter J. Bowler wrote that most biologists believe that Kammerer was a fraud and that even the others claim that he misinterpreted the results of his experiments.

=== Seriality theory ===
Kammerer's other passion was collecting coincidences. His book Das Gesetz der Serie (The Law of the Series, translated into English by Jason David Bulkele as The Law of Seriality) in which he recounted some 100 anecdotes of coincidences that had led him to formulate his theory of seriality.

He postulated that all events are connected by waves of seriality. The unknown forces would cause what is perceived as just the peaks, or groupings and coincidences. Kammerer was known, for example, for making notes in public parks of what numbers of people were passing by, noting, for example, how many carried umbrellas. Albert Einstein called the idea of seriality "interesting, and by no means absurd", and Carl Jung drew upon Kammerer's work in his essay Synchronicity. Arthur Koestler reported that when he was doing research for his biography on Kammerer, he was subjected to "a meteor shower" of coincidences, as if Kammerer's ghost were grinning down at him and saying, "I told you so!"

The standard explanation is that events he observed are simply independent and natural, as such are grouped spontaneously and inevitably with some smaller probability in accordance with Poisson distribution which features Poisson clumping. Standard science has many sufficient tools for explaining series or bursts in different processes.

=== Death ===
Six weeks after the accusation by Noble, Kammerer committed suicide in the forest of Schneeberg, an event which is discussed by Arthur Koestler in his book on Kammerer and his theories.

== Later controversy ==
=== Attempts to reproduce Kammerer's experiments ===
The Lamarckian biologist Ernest MacBride supported the experiments of Kammerer but commented that they would have to be repeated to be accepted by other scientists. The British zoologist Harold Munro Fox attempted to replicate some of Kammerer's experiments but produced negative results. Biology professor Harry Gershenowitz also attempted to duplicate Kammerer's experiment with a related species, Bombina orientalis; but he had to terminate the experiment for lack of funds.

In the 1970s, researcher Jaques P. Durand repeated Kammerer's experiment with inducing sight in olms by raising them in an environment with alternating normal and red light, but concluded that "development and involution of the eye of Proteus are controlled by genetic factors which are not greatly influenced by environment."

=== The Case of the Midwife Toad ===
Interest in Kammerer revived in 1971 with the publication of Arthur Koestler's book The Case of the Midwife Toad. Koestler thought that Kammerer's experiments on the midwife toad may have been tampered with by a Nazi sympathizer at the University of Vienna. Certainly, as Koestler writes, "the Hakenkreuzler, the swastika-wearers, as the Austrian Nazis of the early days were called, were growing in power. One center of ferment was the University of Vienna where, on the traditional Saturday morning student parades, bloody battles were fought. Kammerer was known by his public lectures and newspaper articles as an ardent pacifist and Socialist; it was also known that he was going to build an institute in Soviet Russia. An act of sabotage in the laboratory would have been… in keeping with the climate of those days."

Koestler's claims have been criticized by the scientific community. Gordon Stein noted:

Koestler's book favors evidence that exonerates Kammerer, while downplaying or ignoring evidence against him.... [His] own hidden agenda may be that if Kammerer was right, then Lamarck's idea that acquired characteristics can be inherited is strengthened. The Lamarckian idea supports many ideas that foster parapsychology's theoretical basis. Kammerer was quite interested in the study of coincidences, as was Koestler.

As a consequence of Noble's refutation, interest in Lamarckian inheritance diminished except in the Soviet Union where it was championed by Trofim Lysenko.

=== Other interpretations ===
Sander Gliboff, a historian of biology and professor in the Department of History and Philosophy of Science, Indiana University, has commented that although Kammerer's conclusions proved false, his evidence was probably genuine and he did not simply argue for Lamarckism and against Darwinism as the theories are now understood. Rather, beyond the scandal, the story shows us much about the competing theories of biological and cultural evolution and the range of new ideas about heredity and variation in early 20th-century biology and the changes in experimental approach that have occurred since then.

In 2009, developmental biologist Alexander Vargas, Professor in the Department of Biology, University of Chile, suggested that the inheritance of acquired traits (Lamarckian inheritance) that Kammerer reported to observe in his toad experiments could be authentic and be explained by results from the emerging field of epigenetics. Kammerer could thus actually be considered the discoverer of non-Mendelian, epigenetic inheritance, with chemical modifications to parental DNA (such as through DNA methylation) being passed on to subsequent generations. Furthermore, In Vargas' view, the parent-of-origin effect, which was poorly understood at the time of Kammerer's, might be explained retrospectively, in relation to similar effects seen in other organisms. Professor Gliboff of Indiana University has subsequently argued that Vargas "constructed his model without first reading Kammerer's original articles" and is "seriously misinformed about what Kammerer did and what the results even were" so Vargas's "model... cannot explain the results... originally reported...". Gliboff goes on to challenge strongly that Kammerer should be given credit for discovery of the parent-of-origin effect and states that "Vargas' historical inferences about the Kammerer affair... [and] negative reactions of geneticists... are unsupported and do not stand up to scrutiny".

The reinterpretation of Kammerer's work, in light of epigenetics, remains thus controversial.
