= Law of small numbers =

Law of small numbers may refer to:

- The Law of Small Numbers, a book by Ladislaus Bortkiewicz
  - Poisson distribution, the use of that name for this distribution originated in the book The Law of Small Numbers
- Hasty generalization, a logical fallacy also known as the law of small numbers
  - The tendency for an initial segment of data to show some bias that drops out later, one example in number theory being Kummer's conjecture on cubic Gauss sums
- The strong law of small numbers, an observation made by the mathematician Richard K. Guy: "There aren't enough small numbers to meet the many demands made of them."
- Insensitivity to sample size: a cognitive bias where the larger variability of small samples is neglected.

== See also ==
- Law of large numbers, a theorem that describes results approaching their average probabilities as they increase in sample size. (Hasty generalization is the mistaken application of this law to small data sets.)
- Law of anomalous numbers (also called first-digit law and (Newcomb–)Benford law), an observation about the frequency distribution of leading digits in many real-life sets of numerical data.
- Pigeonhole principle, the occurrence of mathematical coincidences
