= Synchronicity (book) =

Book by Carl Gustav Jung

- 1973 Bollingen paperback edition
- Author: Carl G. Jung
- Published: 1960
- Publisher: Princeton University Press

Synchronicity: An Acausal Connecting Principle, by Carl Gustav Jung, is a book published by Princeton University Press in 1960. It was extracted from Structure & Dynamics of the Psyche, which is volume 8 in The Collected Works of C. G. Jung. The book was also published in 1985 by Routledge.

== Summary ==
Jung sees synchronicity as a meaningful coincidence in time, a psychic factor which is independent of space and time. This revolutionary concept of synchronicity both challenges and complements the physicist's classical view of causality. It also forces a basic reconsideration of the meaning of chance, probability, coincidence and the singular events in our lives.

Jung was intrigued from early in his career with coincidences, especially those surprising juxtapositions that scientific rationality could not adequately explain. He discussed these ideas with Albert Einstein before World War I, but first used the term synchronicity in a 1930 lecture, in reference to the unusual psychological insights generated from consulting the I Ching. A long correspondence and friendship with the Nobel Prize-winning physicist Wolfgang Pauli inspired a final, mature statement of Jung's thinking on synchronicity, originally published in 1952 and reproduced in this book. Together with a wealth of historical and contemporary material, this essay describes an astrological experiment Jung conducted to test his theory. Synchronicity reveals the full extent of Jung's research into a wide range of psychic phenomena.

== Editions ==
- Jung, C. G. 1973. Synchronicity: An Acausal Connecting Principle. Princeton, NJ: Princeton University Press. ISBN 978-0-691-15050-5.
- Jung, C. G. 1985. Synchronicity: An Acausal Connecting Principle. London: Routledge. ISBN 978-0-415-13649-5.

== See also ==
- Coincidance, 1988 book by Robert Anton Wilson
