= The Psychology of the Psychic =

Book by David Marks

- Cover of the 1980 Library Bound Edition
- Author: David Marks; Richard Kammann
- Language: English
- Subjects: Parapsychology, science, psychology
- Publisher: Prometheus Books
- Publication date: 1980 (2nd edition 2000)
- Media type: Print (Hardcover and Paperback)
- Pages: 232
- ISBN: 0-87975-121-5
- OCLC: 43296735
- Dewey Decimal: 133.8/01/9 21
- LC Class: BF1042 .M33 2000

The Psychology of the Psychic is a skeptical analysis of some of the most publicized cases of parapsychological research by psychologists David Marks and Richard Kammann. The first edition, published in 1980, highlights some of the best-known cases from the 1970s. The second edition, published in 2000, adds information from the intervening 20 years as well as substantially more documentation and references to the original material.

== Overview ==
Marks and Kammann give detailed descriptions of experiments conducted by parapsychology researchers as well as performances by psychic entertainers outside of the laboratory during the 1970s. Many of these included some of the most widely known psychic performers of the time, including Uri Geller, Kreskin, and Ingo Swann. In their attempts to replicate the studies of other researchers, the authors discover methodological flaws in the original trials that lead them to the conclusion that no evidence for psychic phenomena has yet been produced. They then discuss psychological research that attempts to explain why people believe in such phenomena in spite of this lack of evidence.

== Background and second edition ==
In the 1970s, many of the students in their University of Otago psychology lectures had suggested to both Marks and Kammann that psychics, particularly Kreskin, were genuine and represented the cutting edge of psychological research. As they put it, "(W)e began our studies on ESP after numerous students had suggested we 'wake up' to psychic reality". At the time, surveys were showing what seemed to the authors to be a startlingly large percentage of people who believed psychic phenomena were or might be real. Far from setting out to disprove psychic phenomena, "(W)e considered it entirely possible that the psychology of perception was about to go through a psychic revolution, and if so, we wanted to be included. But over the next three years of research, when we examined each dazzling claim of ESP, or psychokinesis (PK), we discovered that a simple, natural explanation was far more credible than a supernatural or paranormal one." Regardless of the preferences of the authors, they followed the evidence they found where it led them. As they state in chapter eight, "It is never the scientist’s own conclusion that is important but the quality of his evidence." 104

There were several changes to the book for the second edition. Marks eliminated the chapters on Kreskin, because "he is no longer considered relevant to serious study of the paranormal. He doesn't have any special powers, he admits it, and everybody knows it". Additional chapters cover the Star Gate project (1985 to 1995) the work of Rupert Sheldrake, and the ganzfeld experiments. The final chapter covers the evolution of Marks' own beliefs and attitudes toward the field of parapsychology as a whole.

== Reception ==
Echoing the concerns of the authors regarding the general popularity of parapsychology, psychologist Stuart Sutherland referred to The Psychology of the Psychic as “an excellent book", and noted that it "was turned down by over thirty American publishers, all of whom were competing to publish books endorsing psychic phenomena. The paranormal is therefore available.”

Peter Evans of New Scientist reviewed the book shortly after its first publication in 1980, stating that: "The really interesting question from the scientific standpoint, and one that the authors write about absorbingly in their last few chapters is 'Why do people, including eminent scientists, insist on being so gullible?' . . . Why? Because they want Uri to succeed."

Writers more inclined toward belief in psychic phenomena, such as Robert L. Morris of The Journal of the American Society for Psychical Research, found the book lacking in some areas but useful in others. “The authors are to be commended for the effort they made to carry out their evaluation beyond a simple assessment of the literature they reviewed. As we shall see, however, their specific strategies and tactics leave much to be desired.” Morris recounts examples of miscommunication between the authors and researchers at Stanford Research Institute, and draws the conclusion that, "it is evident that those who wish to evaluate research results need to evolve better procedures for getting at the facts. Researchers need to describe their procedures in more detail, both in print and in unpublished documentation available for inspection, especially if strong claims are made about the presence of psi in the data. Critics need better access to relevant details; they also need to express their questions and doubts more effectively and specifically, if the interactions are to proceed in good faith. When a given information exchange ends, all parties concerned should have a clear understanding of why the information was sought and how it will be used." David Marks acknowledged this criticism, as well as Morris' larger point that the authors had ignored a great deal of the research generally regarded as reliable in parapsychological circles, and therefore included more material on these studies in the second edition.

Humanist commentator Austin Cline wrote in the book review section of his Agnosticism and Atheism column, "the title is after all about the psychology of the psychic, leading the reader to believe that the psychological processes behind belief will get center stage. This is not quite true, but there is a decent amount of such material, and it constitutes some of the most interesting portions of the book."
