= Emil Kaufmann =

Austrian art and architecture historian

Emil Kaufmann (1891 in Vienna – 1953 in Cheyenne, Wyoming) was an Austrian art and architecture historian. He was the son of Max Kaufmann (died 1902), a businessman, and Friederike Baumwald (Kaufmann) (born 1862). Kaufmann is best known for his studies of neo-classicism.

== Career ==
From 1913 he studied at both the University of Innsbruck and the University of Vienna. In Vienna he studied under Max Dvořák, Josef Strzygowski and Moriz Dreger in the spirit of the so-called Vienna School of Art History, such as Alois Riegl and Franz Wickhoff, who attempted to give greater objectivity to the study of art. Kaufmann fought as a soldier in World War I and afterwards attended to his studies intermittently because of illness. He received his Ph.D. in 1920, writing his dissertation under Dvořák on the development of the architecture of Ledoux and classicism. After completing his studies, Kaufmann was unable to obtain an academic position and so earned a living as a bank clerk. In 1933, Kaufmann published the book Von Ledoux bis Le Corbusier, which argued for a formal aesthetic continuity between neoclassicism and modernism. It was regarded by established Austrian scholars such as Hans Sedlmayr as symptomatic of all that was bad about Modernism. Christopher Wood, writing in the 2010s, called it "the most original art-historical thesis of the decade.

After the Anschluss, the annexation of Austria by the Nazis, Kaufmann, a Jew, managed to emigrate to the US, where he taught art history at various universities. In 1952 he published the book Three Revolutionary Architects: Boullée, Ledoux, Lequeu. He died in Wyoming in 1953 while travelling to Los Angeles before his magnum opus, Architecture in the Age of Reason, could be completed. The work was published posthumously in 1955. His style of writing and scholarship is termed formalism, derived to an extent from the philosopher Immanuel Kant's notion of autonomy in art, from his work Critique of Judgement, where, in Kant's own words, art is "a mode of representation which is purposive for itself and which although devoid of a purpose, has the effect of advancing the culture of the mental powers in the interests of communication." Kaufmann was influential on later formalistic architectural historians and critics such the British-American academic Colin Rowe in the 1950s and the Italian architect and theorist Aldo Rossi in the 1960s.

== The works of Emil Kaufmann ==
- Von Ledoux bis Le Corbusier. Ursprung und Entwicklung der Autonomen Architektur. Vienna: Passer, 1933.
- Three Revolutionary Architects: Boullée, Ledoux and Lequeu. In Transactions of the American Philosophical Society 42, no. 3 (1952): pages 431–564.
- Architecture in the Age of Reason. Baroque and Post-Baroque in England, Italy, and France. Cambridge: Harvard University Press 1955.
- Die Entwürfe des Architekten Ledoux und die Àsthetik des Klassizismus. PhD dissertation Vienna,1920). Parts published as:
  - "Die Architekturtheorie der französischen Klassik und des Klassizismus." In: Repertorium für Kunstwissenschaft 44 (1924).
  - "Architektonisch Entwürfe aus der Zeit der französischen Revolution." In: Zeitschrift für bildende Kunst 64 (1929).
  - "Die Stadt des Architekten Ledoux: Zur Erkenntnis der autonomen Architektur. In: Kunstwissenschaftlichen Forschungen 2, no. 1 (1933).
