= Lili Frohlich-Bume =

Lili Frohlich–Bume
- Born: Karoline Bum; May 14, 1886; Vienna, Austria-Hungary
- Died: November 1981 (aged 95); Camberwell, United Kingdom
- Other names: Caroline Bum, Karolina Bum, Lily Fröhlich-Bum
- Education: University of Vienna (Ph.D.)
- Occupations: Art dealer, scholar, art historian, critic
- Spouse: Otto Fröhlich

Lili Frohlich–Bume (born Karoline Bum; 1886–1981) was an Austrian scholar, art historian, art dealer, and art critic. She was a specialist in Italian paintings and drawings, especially Renaissance and Baroque, and trained under the Vienna School scholars.

== Early life and education ==
She was born as Karoline (or Caroline) Bum in Vienna, then the capital of Austria-Hungary, on 14 May 1886. Her father was Ernst Bum, a lawyer and publisher; her mother's name is unknown. She attended a private girls' school in Vienna and completed her Abitur in 1906 at the Ersten Staatsgymnasium in Graz.

From 1906 to 1910 she studied art history, archaeology, and philosophy in Vienna under Max Dvořák, Franz Wickhoff, Julius Schlosser, and Josef Strzygowski. During this time, she collaborated on the Internationale Bibliographie der Kunstwissenschaft, edited by Otto Fröhlich (1873–1947), whom she would eventually marry. She edited volumes VI, VII, and VIII from 1907 to 1909. She earned her doctorate in 1910 from the University of Vienna, supervised by Dvořák.

== Career ==
From 1912 onwards, she worked in her husband's art gallery. Her dissertation, Andrea Meldolla, genannt Schiavone, on Andrea Schiavone, was published in the Jahrbuch der kunsthistorischen Sammlungen in Wien in 1913. Her first book, Parmigianino und der Manierismus, was published in 1921. From 1923 to 1934, Frohlich-Bume worked in the Albertina museum's Collection of Drawings and Prints in Vienna without official employment. Her book Ingres: sein Leben und sein Stil, about Jean-Auguste-Dominique Ingres, was published in 1924, receiving an English-language publication in 1926. She also worked with the director of the collection, Alfred Stix, to compile the catalog of Italian drawings. The first volume, Beschreibender Katalog der Handzeichnungen in der graphischen Sammlung Albertina. I.: Die Zeichnungen der Venezianischen Schule, was published in 1926. Frohlich-Bume also collaborated on the third volume, Beschreibender Katalog der Handzeichnungen in der graphische Sammlung Albertina. III.: Die Zeichnungen der toskanischen, umbrischen und römischen Schulen, published in 1932. During this time, she also regularly published in journals.

Following the Anschluss in 1938, she and her husband emigrated to England due to persecution, as they were both Jewish. Around this time she anglicized her name. From 1938 onwards she lived in London, working as an art dealer and supporting her ill husband until his death in 1947. Frohlich-Bume was naturalized in 1948, and began journalistic work for various magazines the same year. From 1954 onwards, she published numerous exhibition and auction reports for the German art magazine Weltkunst, primarily from London.

== Death and legacy ==
Frohlich-Bume died in November 1981 in Camberwell, near London. Her name is included on the Art Historians' Monument at the University of Vienna, erected in 2008, which memorializes faculty and alumni who were displaced, ostracized, or murdered by Austro-fascism and Nazism.

== Works ==
=== Books ===
- [dissertation:] Andrea Meldolla, genannt Schiavone. Vienna, 1910, published, Jahrbuch der Kunsthistorischen Sammlungen in Wien 31 (1913): 138–220
- contributed: Internationale Bibliographie der Kunstwissenschaft. Berlin: Behr, 1907–1909, vol. VI–VIII
- Parmigianino und der Manierismus. Vienna: Anton Schroll & Co., 1921
- Ingres: sein Leben und sein Stil. Vienna: Manz, 1924, English, White, Maude Valérie (trans.): Ingres: His Life & Art. London: Heinemann, 1926
- and Stix, Alfred: Beschreibender Katalog der Handzeichnungen in der graphischen Sammlung Albertina. I.: Die Zeichnungen der Venezianischen Schule. Vienna: A. Schroll, 1926
- and Stix, Alfred: Beschreibender Katalog der Handzeichnungen in der graphische Sammlung Albertina. III.: Die Zeichnungen der toskanischen, umbrischen und römischen Schulen. Vienna: Schroll, 1932

=== Papers ===
- "Some Unknown Venetian Drawings in the Albertina." The Burlington Magazine for Connoisseurs 43, no. 244 (July 1923): 28–29
- "Five Drawings for Titian's Altarpiece of St. Peter Martyr." The Burlington Magazine for Connoisseurs 45, no. 261 (December 1924): 280–281
- "Some Unpublished Portraits by Parmigianino." The Burlington Magazine for Connoisseurs 46, no. 263 (February 1925): 87–89
- "Two Drawings by Guardi in the Dresden Print-Room." The Burlington Magazine for Connoisseurs 49, no. 280 (July 1926): 31–32
- "Two Unpublished Sketches by Titian." The Burlington Magazine for Connoisseurs 51, no. 296 (November 1927): 228–229
- "An Unpublished Drawing by Giovanni Santi." The Burlington Magazine for Connoisseurs 53, no. 304 (July 1928): 43–44
- "Three Drawings by Palma Vecchio." The Burlington Magazine for Connoisseurs 55, no. 317 (August 1929): 81–82
- "A Rediscovered Work by Parmigianino." The Burlington Magazine for Connoisseurs 56, no. 326 (May 1930): 273–274
- "Two Unknown Portraits by Jacopo Bassano." The Burlington Magazine for Connoisseurs 60, no. 347 (February 1932): 88–91
- "Some Original Compositions by Francesco and Leandro Bassano." The Burlington Magazine for Connoisseurs 61, no. 354 (September 1932): 113–114
- "A Rediscovered Work by Paris Bordone." The Burlington Magazine for Connoisseurs 64, no. 375 (June 1934): 282–287
- "Unpublished Drawings by Parmigianino." Old Master Drawings 9 (1935): 555–557
- "An Unknown Drawing by Raphael." The Burlington Magazine for Connoisseurs 67, no. 389 (August 1935): 88
- "Bozzetti and Modelletti of the Late Renaissance and the Baroque." The Burlington Magazine for Connoisseurs 70, no. 408 (March 1937): 133–134
- "A Design by Vittore Carpaccio." The Burlington Magazine for Connoisseurs 70, no. 408 (March 1937): 137
- "Bernardino Licinio: Sheet of Studies Showing Two Sketches for a Composition of a Gentleman With a Lady Making Music." Old Master Drawings 12 (1937/38): 49–50
- "Notes on Some Works by Giovanni Battista Tiepolo." The Burlington Magazine for Connoisseurs 72, no. 419 (February 1938): 82–87
- "A Rediscoverd Picture by Artemisia Gentileschi." The Burlington Magazine for Connoisseurs 77, no. 453 (November 1940): 169
- "Some Sketches by Jacopo Bassano." The Burlington Magazine 90, no. 543 (June 1948): 169–170
- "An Unknown Portrait by Parmigianino." The Burlington Magazine 91, no. 553 (April 1949): 110
- "Three Unknown Drawings for Famous Pictures." Gazette des Beaux-Arts 96, no. 44 (1954): 355–360
- "Some "Adorations" by Jacopo Bassano." Apollo 65, no. 388 (1957): 212–217
- "Additions to a Corpus of Drawings of Parmigianino." Gazette des Beaux-Arts 100, no. 51 (1958): 9–14
- "Some Paintings by Pellegrini." Apollo 69, no. 412 (1959): 188–191
- "An Unknown Portrait by Parmigianino." Pantheon 18 (1960): 114–116
- "Five Unpublished Drawings by Parmigianino." Pantheon 18 (1960): 236–241
- "Some Unpublished Drawings by Parmigianino." Apollo 76, no. 9 (1962): 693–696
