= Rudolf Eitelberger =

Austrian art historian (1817–1885)

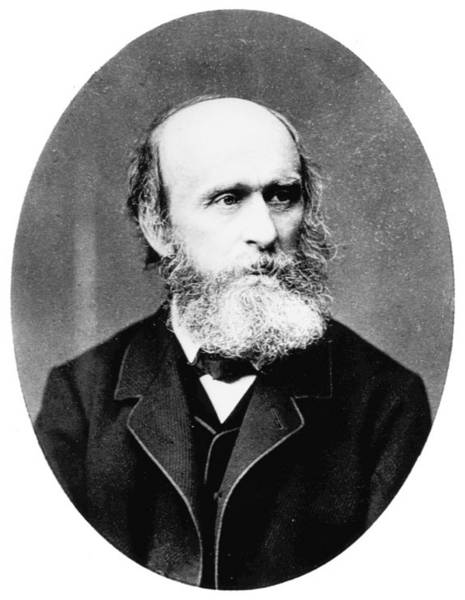
- Portrait of Eitelberger
- Born: 17 April 1817; Olomouc, Moravia, Austrian Empire
- Died: 18 April 1885 (aged 68); Vienna, Austria-Hungary

Rudolf Eitelberger (full name Rudolf Eitelberger von Edelberg; 17 April 1817 – 18 April 1885) was an Austrian art historian and the first Ordinarius (full professor) for art history at the University of Vienna. He is considered as the founder of the Vienna School of Art History.

== Life ==
Eitelberger was born on 17 April 1817 in Olomouc, the son of a military officer. He studied law and the Romance languages at University of Olomouc. From 1839 through 1848 he was a lecturer in philology at the University of Vienna. In the meantime he educated himself in the history of art, mounting an exhibit of old master paintings in 1846 and serving as a Privatdozent (private lecturer) in art history.

Eitelberger was a committed reformist throughout the Vormärz, and during the events of 1848 served as the editor of the Wiener Zeitung, a pro-revolutionary literary journal. He was particularly concerned with the role of art history in the education of artists; also in 1848 he published a polemic against the pedagogical methods of Ferdinand Georg Waldmüller, at that time director of the Academy of Fine Arts. After the failure of the revolution, in 1850, Eitelberger delivered a series of lectures on art history, the first of which was entitled "Die Bildungsanstalten für Künstler und ihre historische Entwicklung" ("Institutions for the education of artists and their historical development").

Eitelberger's activities attracted the attention of the Austrian Minister for Religion and Education, Count Leopold Thun-Hohenstein, who attempted to secure him a position as professor of art history at the University. However, Eitelberger's theories and political activity remained controversial, and his appointment was initially vetoed by Emperor Franz Joseph. Thun resubmitted his petition, and on 5 November 1852 Eitelberger was named Professor für Kunstgeschichte und Kunstarchäologie (Professor of the History of Archaeology of Art) at the University of Vienna. He thus became one of the first professors of art history in Europe. Gustav Friedrich Waagen had been appointed to a similar chair at the Humboldt University of Berlin in 1844, and the appointment of Eitelberger may have represented a Habsburg attempt to keep pace with the cultural policies of Prussia.

Eitelberger's activities as professor embraced both scholarly and practical, educational endeavors. Together with Gustav Heider he published a two-volume corpus of the Mittelalterliche Kunstdenkmäler des österreichischen Kaiserstaates (Medieval monuments of the Austrian Empire), and in 1871 he founded the series Quellenschriften für Kunstgeschichte (Source Texts for Art History).

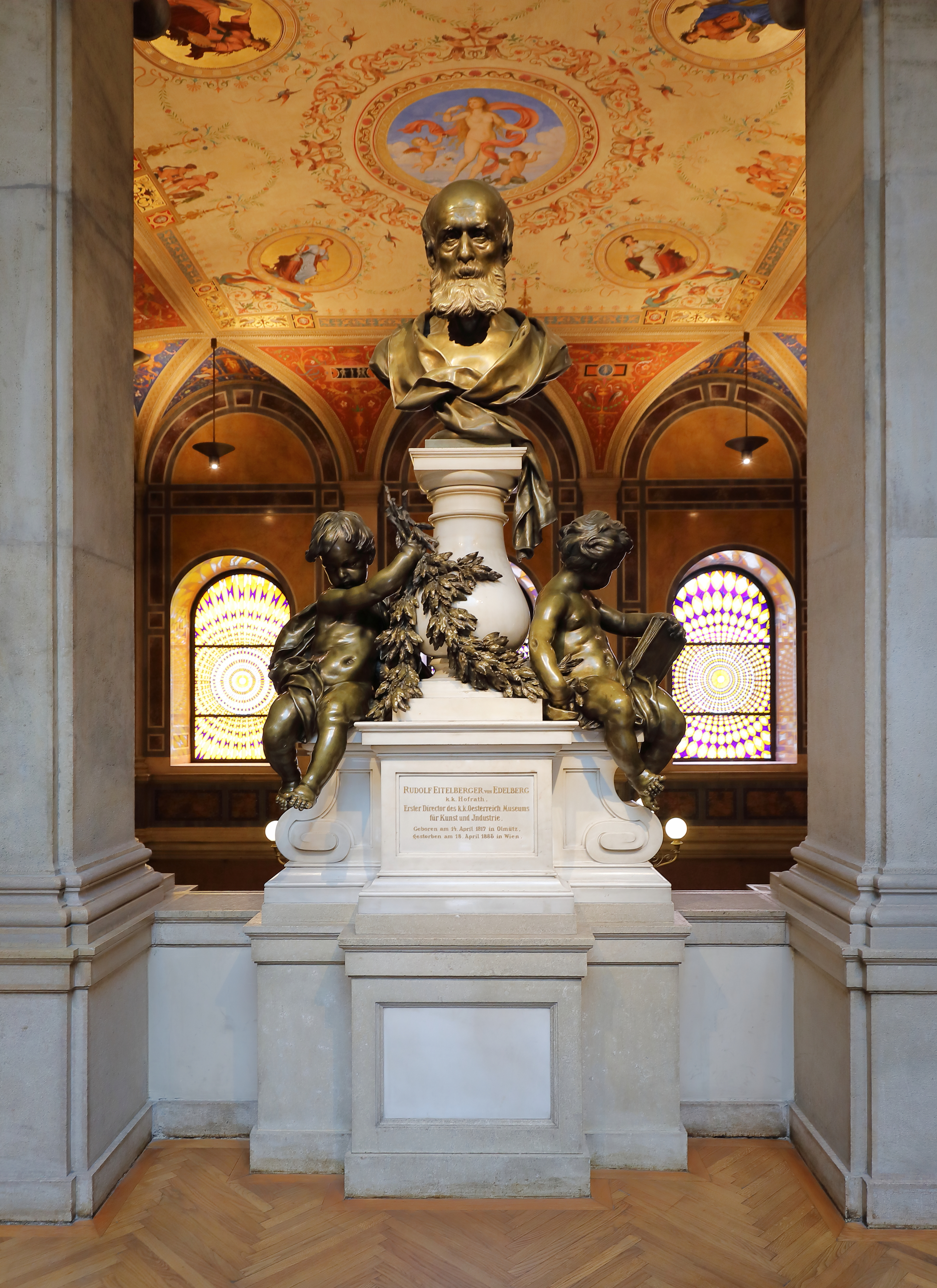
Eitelberger memorial in the Museum of Applied Arts, Vienna

In the practical realm, Eitelberger and Jakob Falke co-founded in 1864 the k.k. Österreichisches Museum für Kunst und Industrie (Imperial Austrian Museum for Art and Industry), today the Österreichisches Museum für angewandte Kunst (Austrian Museum for Applied Art), which was inspired by the South Kensington Museum in London. In 1868 he founded the museum's educational component, the Kunstgewerbeschule, today the Universität für angewandte Kunst (University for Applied Art).

Eitelberger died on 18 April 1885 in Vienna, at the age of 68.

== Legacy ==
Eitelberger insisted on the priority of the object in the history of art, and therefore lectured exclusively in the galleries of his museum. This insistence on the close attention to the visual properties of works of art became a characteristic of the Vienna School of Art History, and was continued by Eitelberger's students and successors, Moritz Thausing, Franz Wickhoff, and Alois Riegl. Eitelberger's simultaneous interest in the historical context of objects, expressed in his series of Quellenschriften, also became a hallmark of the Vienna School, and was pursued in particular by Julius von Schlosser.

Eitelberger's commitment to the training of contemporary artists, and his insistence on the importance of the art of the past for art of the present, rendered him a central figure in the historicist movement in 19th-century Austria. He conceived art history and the practice of art as a unity, a principle expressed in his maxim: "He who wishes to pursue art history must possess a natural inclination towards art itself."

== Works ==
- Die Reform des Kunstunterrichts und Professor Waldmüllers Lehrmethode (Vienna, 1848).
- Cividale in Friaul und seine Monumente (Vienna, 1857).
- Mittelalterliche Kunstdenkmale des österreichischen Kaiserstaates, two volumes (Vienna, 1858–1860).
- Die preisgekrönten Entwürfe zur Erweiterung der inneren Stadt Wien: mit sieben in der Kaiserlich-Königlichen Hof- und Staatsdruckerei in Farbendruck ausgeführten Plänen und einem erläuternden Texte (Vienna, 1859).
- Editor, Quellenschriften für Kunstgeschichte und Kunsttechnik des Mittelalters und der Neuzeit, 18 volumes (Vienna, 1871–1908).
- Gesammelte kunsthistorische Schriften, four volumes (Vienna, 1879–1894).
