= Architectural style =

Specific method of construction

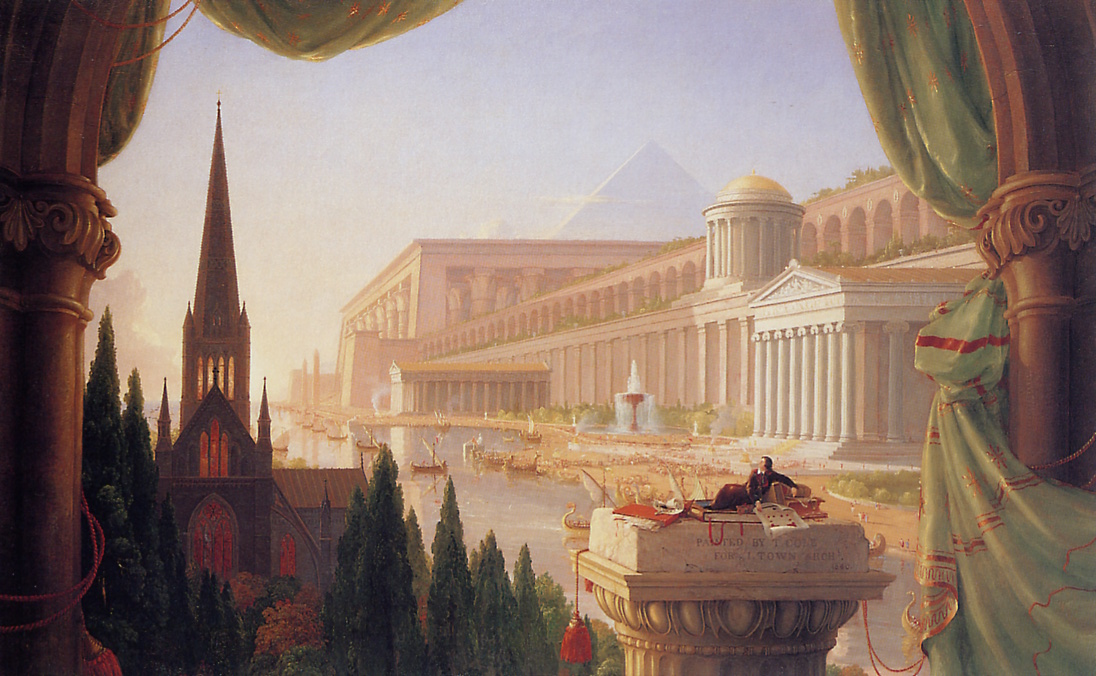
The Architect's Dream by Thomas Cole (1840) shows a vision of buildings in the historical styles of the Western tradition, including ancient Egyptian, ancient Greek, ancient Roman, and Gothic.

An architectural style is a classification of buildings (and building structures) based on characteristics and features, including overall appearance, arrangement of the components, method of construction, building materials used, form, size, structural style, and regional character.

Architectural styles are frequently associated with a historical epoch (Renaissance style), geographical location (Italian Villa style), or an earlier architectural style (Neo-Gothic style), and are influenced by the corresponding broader artistic style and the "general human condition". Heinrich Wölfflin even declared an analogy between a building and a costume: an "architectural style reflects the attitude and the movement of people in the period concerned".

The 21st century construction uses a multitude of styles that are sometimes lumped together as a "contemporary architecture" based on the common trait of extreme reliance on computer-aided architectural design (cf. Parametricism).

Folk architecture (also "vernacular architecture") is not a style, but an application of local customs to small-scale construction without clear identity of the builder.

== Styles in the history of architecture ==
The concept of architectural style is studied in the architectural history as one of the approaches ("style and period") that are used to organize the history of architecture (Leach lists five other approaches as "biography, geography and culture, type, technique, theme and analogy"). Style provides an additional relationship between otherwise disparate buildings, thus serving as a "protection against chaos".

The concept of style was foreign to architects until the 18th century. Prior to the era of Enlightenment, the architectural form was mostly considered timeless, either as a divine revelation or an absolute truth derived from the laws of nature, and a great architect was the one who understood this "language". The new interpretation of history declared each historical period to be a stage of growth for the humanity (cf. Johann Gottfried Herder's Volksgeist that much later developed into Zeitgeist). This approach allowed to classify architecture of each age as an equally valid approach, "style" (the use of the word in this sense became established by the mid-18th century).

Style has been the subject of an extensive debate since at least the 19th century. Many architects argue that the notion of "style" cannot adequately describe the contemporary architecture, is obsolete and ridden with historicism. In their opinion, by concentrating on the appearance of the building, style classification misses the hidden from view ideas that architects had put into the form. Studying history of architecture without reliance on styles usually relies on a "canon" of important architects and buildings. The lesser objects in this approach do not deserve attention: "A bicycle shed is a building; Lincoln Cathedral is a piece of architecture" (Nikolaus Pevsner, 1943). Nonetheless, the traditional and popular approach to the architectural history is through chronology of styles, with changes reflecting the evolution of materials, economics, fashions, and beliefs.

Works of architecture are unlikely to be preserved for their aesthetic value alone; with practical re-purposing, the original intent of the original architect, sometimes his very identity, can be forgotten, and the building style becomes "an indispensable historical tool".

== Evolution of style ==
Styles emerge from the history of a society. At any time several styles may be fashionable, and when a style changes it usually does so gradually, as architects learn and adapt to new ideas. The new style is sometimes only a rebellion against an existing style, such as postmodern architecture (meaning "after modernism"), which in 21st century has found its own language and split into a number of styles which have acquired other names.

Architectural styles often spread to other places, so that the style at its source continues to develop in new ways while other countries follow with their own twist. For instance, Renaissance ideas emerged in Italy around 1425 and spread to all of Europe over the next 200 years, with the French, German, English, and Spanish Renaissances showing recognisably the same style, but with unique characteristics. An architectural style may also spread through colonialism, either by foreign colonies learning from their home country, or by settlers moving to a new land. One example is the Spanish missions in California, brought by Spanish priests in the late 18th century and built in a unique style.

After an architectural style has gone out of fashion, revivals and re-interpretations may occur. For instance, classicism has been revived many times and found new life as neoclassicism. Each time it is revived, it is different. The Spanish mission style was revived 100 years later as the Mission Revival, and that soon evolved into the Spanish Colonial Revival.

== History of the concept of architectural style ==
Early writing on the subjects of architectural history, since the works of Vitruvius in the 1st century B.C., treated architecture as a patrimony that was passed on to the next generation of architects by their forefathers. Giorgio Vasari in the 16th century shifted the narrative to biographies of the great artists in his "Lives of the Most Excellent Painters, Sculptors, and Architects".

Constructing schemes of the period styles of historic art and architecture was a major concern of 19th century scholars in the new and initially mostly German-speaking field of art history. Important writers on the broad theory of style including Carl Friedrich von Rumohr, Gottfried Semper, and Alois Riegl in his Stilfragen of 1893, with Heinrich Wölfflin and Paul Frankl continued the debate into the 20th century. Paul Jacobsthal and Josef Strzygowski are among the art historians who followed Riegl in proposing grand schemes tracing the transmission of elements of styles across great ranges in time and space. This type of art history is also known as formalism, or the study of forms or shapes in art. Wölfflin declared the goal of formalism as German: Kunstgeschichtliche Grundbegriffe, "art history without names", where an architect's work has a place in history that is independent of its author. The subject of study no longer was the ideas that Borromini borrowed from Maderno who in turn learned from Michelangelo, instead the questions now were about the continuity and changes observed when the architecture transitioned from Renaissance to Baroque.

Semper, Wölfflin, and Frankl, and later Ackerman, had backgrounds in the history of architecture, and like many other terms for period styles, "Romanesque" and "Gothic" were initially coined to describe architectural styles, where major changes between styles can be clearer and more easy to define, not least because style in architecture is easier to replicate by following a set of rules than style in figurative art such as painting. Terms originated to describe architectural periods were often subsequently applied to other areas of the visual arts, and then more widely still to music, literature and the general culture. In architecture stylistic change often follows, and is made possible by, the discovery of new techniques or materials, from the Gothic rib vault to modern metal and reinforced concrete construction. A major area of debate in both art history and archaeology has been the extent to which stylistic change in other fields like painting or pottery is also a response to new technical possibilities, or has its own impetus to develop (the kunstwollen of Riegl), or changes in response to social and economic factors affecting patronage and the conditions of the artist, as current thinking tends to emphasize, using less rigid versions of Marxist art history.

Although style was well-established as a central component of art historical analysis, seeing it as the over-riding factor in art history had fallen out of fashion by World War II, as other ways of looking at art were developing, and a reaction against the emphasis on style developing; for Svetlana Alpers, "the normal invocation of style in art history is a depressing affair indeed". According to James Elkins "In the later 20th century criticisms of style were aimed at further reducing the Hegelian elements of the concept while retaining it in a form that could be more easily controlled".

== Practical issues ==
In the middle of the 19th century, multiple aesthetic and social factors forced architects to design the new buildings using a selection of styles patterned after the historical ones (working "in every style or none"), and style definition became a practical matter. The choice of an appropriate style was subject of elaborate discussions; for example, the Cambridge Camden Society had argued that the churches in the new British colonies should be built in the Norman style, so that the local architects and builders can go through the paces repeating the architectural history of England.

== See also ==
- Historicism (architecture)
- History of architecture
- List of architectural styles
- Revivalism (architecture)
