= Otto Pächt =

Austrian art historian

Otto Pächt (7 September 1902 – 17 April 1988) was an Austrian art historian and one of the representatives of the second wave of the Vienna School of Art History. He mostly wrote on the medieval and Renaissance art of Europe. An exile from the Nazis, he taught in England and United States, before returning to Austria in 1963.

== Early life and education ==
Pächt was born in Vienna on 7 September 1902 into a Jewish family. His father David Pächt, a Jewish industrialist who owned a successful textile factory in Vienna, came from Bukovina, and his mother, née Josefine Freundlich, from Vienna. His mother was a member of the Israelitische Kultusgemeinde Wien, the body that represented Vienna's Jewish community.

He attended one of the 'Humanistisches Staatsgymnasium' in Vienna, a grammar school in which the classical languages Latin and ancient Greek are taught as the basis of European culture. In 1920 entered university in Vienna to study art history.

Unlike his colleagues and the Germanic higher education model, where students moved from university to university to attend classes, Pächt remained in Vienna except for one semester in Berlin studying with Adolph Goldschmidt, and some contact with Wilhelm Pinder (q.v) in Leipzig. His principal influences in Vienna were the major forces in the so-called second or new "Vienna School" of art history: Max Dvořák, Karl Maria Swoboda, whose assistant he was, and Julius von Schlosser, the latter supervising his dissertation on medieval painting in 1925 "Das Verhältnis von Bild und Vorwurf in der mittelalterlichen Entwicklung der Historiendarstellung", supervised by Julius von Schlosser.

Pächt was, alongside Hans Sedlmayr, one of the proponents of art-historical Strukturforschung, a key scholar of the so-called New Vienna School of Art History (an art-historical school involved in the reformulation of methodological approaches first advanced by Alois Riegl). Between 1926 and 1930 he co-edited the new serial "Kritische Berichte zur kunstgeschichtlichen Literatur" (founded by Pächt and Bruno Fürst and in 1931 and 1933 edited the first (and only) two issues of Kunstwissenschaftliche Forschungen in collaboration with Sedlmayer). His doctoral dissertation (Habilitation) of 1932 was written on the painter Michael Pacher, supervised by August Grisebach at Heidelberg. It was published 1933 as a short article in the journal Kunstwissenschaftliche Forschungen. With the rise of National Socialism in Germany in 1933, Pächt's university post was revoked and he returned to Vienna. Shortly before the Anschluss, in 1936, Pächt left Austria to accept an invitation by the Irish George Furlong, Director of the National Gallery of Ireland.

== Life in London and Oxford ==
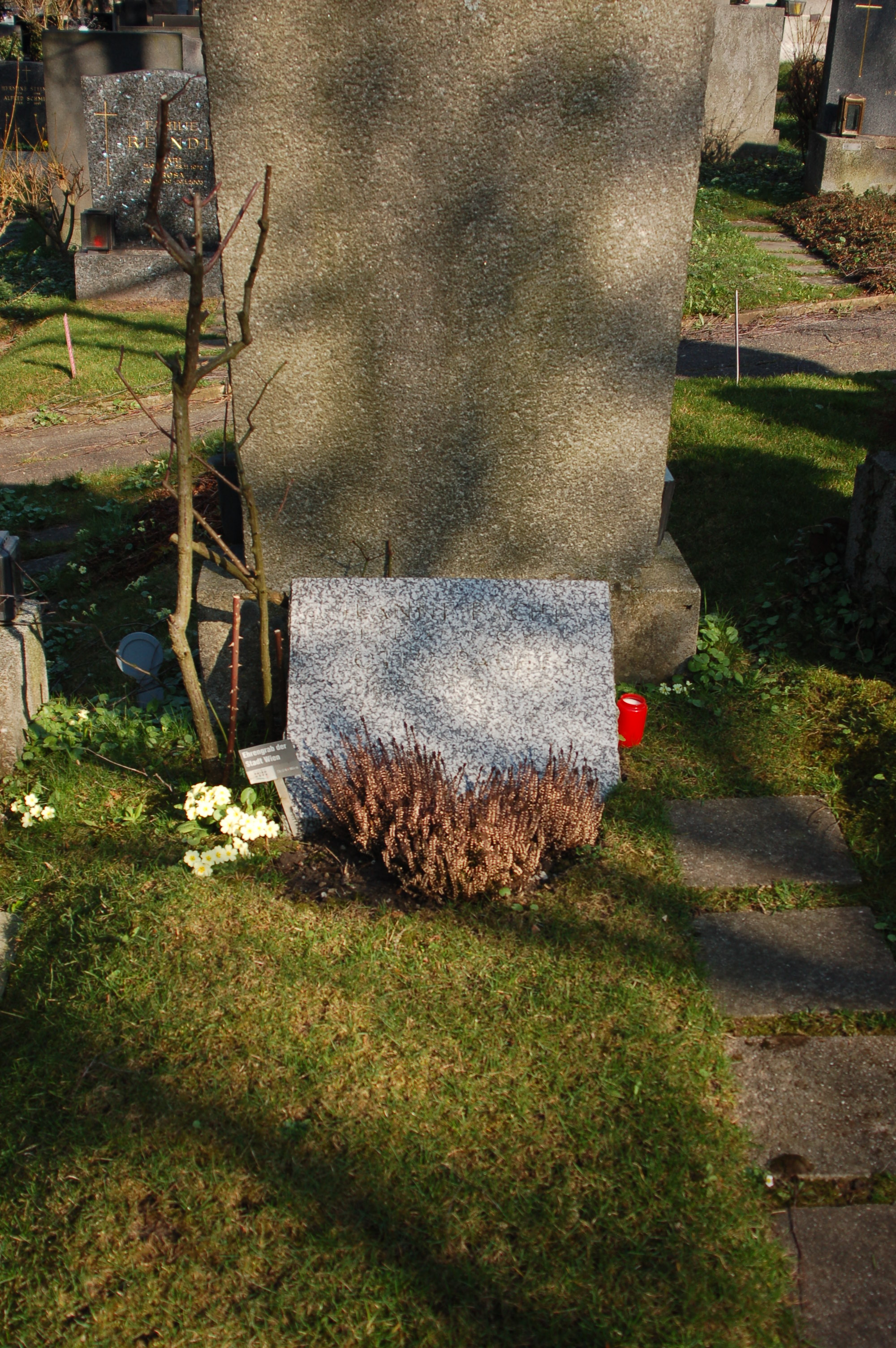
Gravesite of Pächt at the Neustifter Friedhof in Vienna

From 1937 until 1941, he lectured in London at the Courtauld Institute and Warburg Institute, whose director was the viennese Fritz Saxl. At Oxford University, he was entrusted with the cataloguing of the collection of manuscripts of the Bodleian Library, Oxford, which resulted in a 3-volume catalogue "Illuminated Manuscripts in the Bodleian Library", published in 1966, 1970 and 1973 together with his pupil J.J.G. Alexander. From 1945 he held an honorary lectureship in medieval art at Oriel College, and in 1950 was appointed fellower of the University. In the 1950s and 1960s Pächt held short-term positions at Princeton University, Cambridge and New York.

== Return to Vienna ==
In 1963, at the invitation of Otto Demus, he was appointed professor of art history at the University of Vienna. From 1969, Pächt headed the Department of Manuscripts at the Austrian National Library, and following his retirement in 1972, he compiled and edited a catalogue of illuminated manuscripts of the Vienna National Library, which appeared 1974 under the title "Die illuminierten Handschriften und Inkunabeln der Österreichischen Nationalbibliothek" as vol. I of the series "Veröffentlichungen der Kommission für Schrift- und Buchwesen des Mittelalters".

Otto Pacht died in Vienna on 17 April 1988 and is buried in the city's Neustifter Friedhof.

Photographs by Otto Pacht are held at the Conway Library in the Courtauld, London, and are being digitised.

== Representative work ==
- Das Verhältnis von Bild und Vorwurf in der mittelalterliche Entwicklung der Historiendarstellung, Phil. Diss., (doctoral dissertation), Vienna, 1925.
- Österreichische Tafelmalerei der Gotik. Augsburg, 1929.
- Gestaltungsprinzipien der westlichen Malerei des 15. Jahrunderts, (Habilitationsschrift), Heidelberg, 1932. Published partially as: "Gestaltungsprinzipien der westlichen Malerei des 15. Jahrhunderts". In: Kunstwissenschaftliche Forschungen 2 (1933): p. 75–100.
- "Die historische Aufgabe Michael Pachers". In: Kunstwissenschaftliche Forschungen, 1, Berlin 1931, p. 95–132.
- "A Book of Hours by Jean Fouquet". In: The Bodleian Library Record, 1, Oxford 1941, p. 245–247.
- The Master of Mary of Burgundy, London 1948.
- "Early Italian Nature Studies and the Early Calendar Landscape". In: Journal of the Warburg and Courtauld Institutes, 13, London 1950, p. 13–47.
- "The Avignon Diptych and its Eastern Ancestry". In: De atticus opuscula XL. Essays in Honor of Erwin Panofsky, ed. M. Meiss, New York, 1961, p. 402–421.
- "Die Gotik der Zeit um 1400 als gesamteuropäische Kunstsprache", in: Exhibition. cat. Europäische Kunst um 1400, Vienna 1962.
- "Panofsky's 'Early Netherlandish Painting'", Burlington Magazine 98 (1956), part I (April): 110-116, part II (August): 267–79.
- "Alois Riegl", Burlington Magazine 105 (May 1963): 188–93.
- Methodisches zur Kunstgeschichtlichen Praxis, ausgewählte Schriften, Munich: Prestel, 1977. Translated in English as The Practice of Art History: Reflections on Method, London Harvey Miller, 1999.
- Van Eyck: Die Begründer der altniederländischen Malerei. Munich: 1989. Translated as Van Eyck and the Founders of Early Netherlandish Painting, 1994.
- Book Illumination in the Middle Ages. An Introduction. London: Harvey Miller Publishers, 1994.
- Early Netherlandish Painting. From Rogier van der Weyden to Gerard David, ed. by Monika Rosenauer, London: Harvey Miller Publishers, 1997.
- Venetian Painting in the Fifteenth Century. From Mantegna to Bellini. London: Harvey Miller Publishers, 2003.

== Decorations and awards ==
- Since 1956: Member of the British Academy
- Since 1967: Member of the Austrian Academy of Sciences
- *1976: Wilhelm Hartel Prize Austrian Decoration for Science and Art
- 1976: Austrian Cross of Honor for Sciences and Art, First Class
- 1971: Honorary Doctor from the University of Oxford
- 1981: Ehrenmedaille der Bundeshauptstadt Wien in Gold
- 1982: "Officier de l'Ordre National de Mérite de la République Française"
- 1985: Austrian Decoration for Science and Art
