= Moritz Thausing =

Austrian art historian (1838–1884)

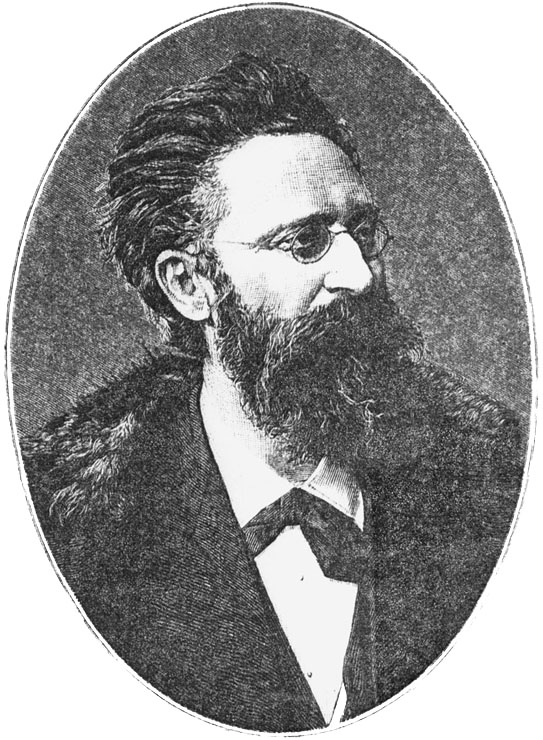
Portrait of Thausing.

Moritz Thausing (3 June 1838 – 11 August 1884) was an Austrian art historian, and counts among the founders of the Vienna School of Art History.

== Life ==
The son of a palace official in Schloß Tschischkowitz (modern Čížkovice, near Litoměřice in the Kingdom of Bohemia), Thausing began his academic career as a student of German literature and history. He studied first in Prague, and in 1858 went to Vienna, where he studied at the Österreichische Institut für Geschichtsforschung (Austrian Institute for Historical Research). There he came into contact with Rudolf Eitelberger, who since 1852 had held the first chair in art history at the University of Vienna. Under his influence Thausing began to study the history of art. In 1862 he received an appointment as a library assistant at the Akademie der bildenden Künste, where he also gave general lectures on world and cultural history. In 1864 Eitelberger secured a position for him with the print collection of the Albertina, which he would direct beginning in 1868, although he received the formal title of Director only in 1876.

In 1871 Thausing was an active participant in the so-called "Holbein convention" in Dresden, at which a number of prominent art historians convened to determine which of two versions of Hans Holbein the Younger's Meyer Madonna was the original work.

In 1873, once again due to the advocacy of Eitelberger, Thausing was appointed as a professor extraordinarius for art history at the University, and became ordinarius in 1879. A progressive mental illness overshadowed his final years. His health declined dramatically after he became interim director of the newly founded Istituto Austriaco di studi storici in Rome. Following a temporary commitment to a mental hospital, he died during a vacation in his homeland through drowning (probably intentional) in the Elbe near Litoměřice.

== Legacy ==
In methodological hindsight, Thausing played a decisive role in the development of art history as an autonomous discipline. Although his mentor, Eitelberger, had already sought to lend historical research and the aesthetic appreciation of art equal weight, Thausing sought the complete separation of art history from aesthetics. The task of the art historian was, for him, solely the establishment of facts regarding any given work, and not aesthetic judgment. In this regard he was profoundly influenced by the so-called "experimental method" of the Italian scientist and connoisseur Giovanni Morelli, whom he honored as his "fratello in Raffaele" ("brother in Raphael"). Morelli had developed a meticulous procedure, through which he claimed to be able to determine the painter of a work through analysis of physiognomic details. Although this procedure was somewhat inaccessible, it represented a first step toward the comparative stylistic analyses that would serve as a foundation for modern art history. The transition from Morellian connoisseurship to stylistic analysis was conclusively effected by Thausing's students, and in particular by Alois Riegl and Franz Wickhoff, the most important representatives of the Vienna School of art history.

== Sources ==
This entry is substantially based on the comparable entry in the German Wikipedia.

== Selected works ==
- Dürers Briefe, Tagebücher und Reime (Vienna, 1872).
- Die Votivkirche in Wien (Vienna, 1879).
- Le livre d'esquisses de J. J. Callot (Vienna, 1881).
- Dürer. Geschichte seines Lebens und seiner Kunst, two volumes (Leipzig, 1876; English edition: London, 1882).
- Wiener Kunstbriefe (Leipzig, 1884).

== Selected secondary literature ==
- Rudolf von Eitelberger, "Nekrolog Moriz Thausing," Wiener Zeitung, 26 August 1884, pp. 4 ff.
- Simon Laschitzer, "Nekrolog Moriz Thausing," Kunst-Chronik: Beiblatt zur Zeitschrift für bildende Kunst 19 (45), 9 October 1884, pp. 749 ff.
- Julius von Schlosser, "Die Wiener Schule der Kunstgeschichte," Mitteilungen des Österreichischen Instituts für Geschichtsforschung 13 (Innsbruck, 1934).
- Artur Rosenauer, "Moriz Thausing und die Wiener Schule der Kunstgeschichte," Wiener Jahrbuch für Kunstgeschichte 36 (1983), pp. 135 ff.
