= Otto Demus =

Austrian art historian and Byzantinist

Otto Demus (born St. Pölten, Austria, 1902; died Vienna, 17 November 1990) was an Austrian art historian and Byzantinist. He is considered a member of the Vienna School of Art History.

Between 1921 and 1928, Demus studied art history at the University of Vienna under Josef Strzygowski, receiving his Ph.D. summa cum laude. In the following years Demus travelled throughout Greece, photographing the mosaics of its Byzantine churches in color, a project that resulted in his first major publication, Byzantine mosaics in Greece (1931), written together with Ernst Diez. He also worked for Austria's historical preservation service, documenting and restoring the medieval monuments of Carinthia. In 1936 he returned to Vienna, and defended his habilitation the following year. With this necessary qualification, Demus began to lecture on the history at the University of Vienna.

Following the Anschluss in 1938, Demus decided to leave Austria, now under Nazi control, and emigrated to Great Britain in 1939, where he found employment as a librarian at the Warburg Institute and as a lecturer at the Courtauld Institute of Art. Due to his Austrian background, in 1940 he was interned and sent to Canada for a brief period as a civilian internee, after which he returned to Britain. The main scholarly fruits of his British years were his highly influential essay on middle Byzantine mosaic programs, Byzantine mosaic decoration (1947), and his foundational study of the Mosaics of Norman Sicily (1949).

In 1946 Demus returned to Austria, accepting a position as president of the newly organized Bundesdenkmalamt (Federal Monuments Office), a post he would occupy for nearly twenty years. He was a frequent fellow at Dumbarton Oaks in Washington, which allowed him time to continue his studies in Byzantine art. There he worked along with Kurt Weitzmann, Ernst Kitzinger, Hugo Buchthal and James H. Stubblebine. These researches resulted in a study of The church at San Marco in Venice: history, architecture, sculpture (1960). In 1963, Demus was appointed Professor of art history at the University of Vienna, which he and the manuscript specialist Otto Pächt turned into a "Mekka der Mittelalterkunstgeschichte" ("a mecca for medieval art history").

Demus's books from this period turned increasingly to western medieval art: Romanische Wandmalerei (Romanesque wall painting) (1968), a thoughtful study masquerading as a coffee-table book, and Byzantine art and the West (1970), the product of his Wrightsman Lectures at New York University.

Late in life, already having turned 70, Demus embarked on the most ambitious scholarly project of his career, namely the restoration and documentation of the mosaics of St Mark's Basilica (San Marco) in Venice. Demus was an untiring participant in the project, ascending the scaffolding daily to inspect the mosaics first hand, and the result was his monumental The mosaics of San Marco in Venice (1984). Having now turned 80, Demus undertook one final project, the documentation of the late medieval art of Carinthia, where he had served in the monuments service in his youth. Demus drove to the sites and took the photos himself, producing in the end the 750-page Spätgotischen Altäre Kärntens (The late Gothic altars of Carinthia) (1991).

Demus was the consummate Viennese art historian, trusting his eye and developing a massive visual repertoire through the painstaking first-hand inspection of monuments. This side of his activity was expressed in his major monographic studies. He was also, however, "the master of the short essay, which set him free from the demands of a 'serious' book." His highly intellectual and imaginative Byzantine mosaic decoration has been described as "one of the most important books on medieval art this century", and displays the imprint of the old master of Viennese art history, Alois Riegl.

== Decorations and awards ==
- 1959: Austrian Cross of Honour for Science and Art, 1st class
- 1965: Grand Decoration of Honour for Services to the Republic of Austria (1985)
- 1969: Wilhelm Hartel Prize
- 1975: Austrian Decoration for Science and Art

== Literature ==
- H. Belting, "Otto Demus, 1902–1990" Dumbarton Oaks Papers 45 (1991), vii-xi.
