= Adolf Loos's Dvořák mausoleum =

Unbuilt mausoleum

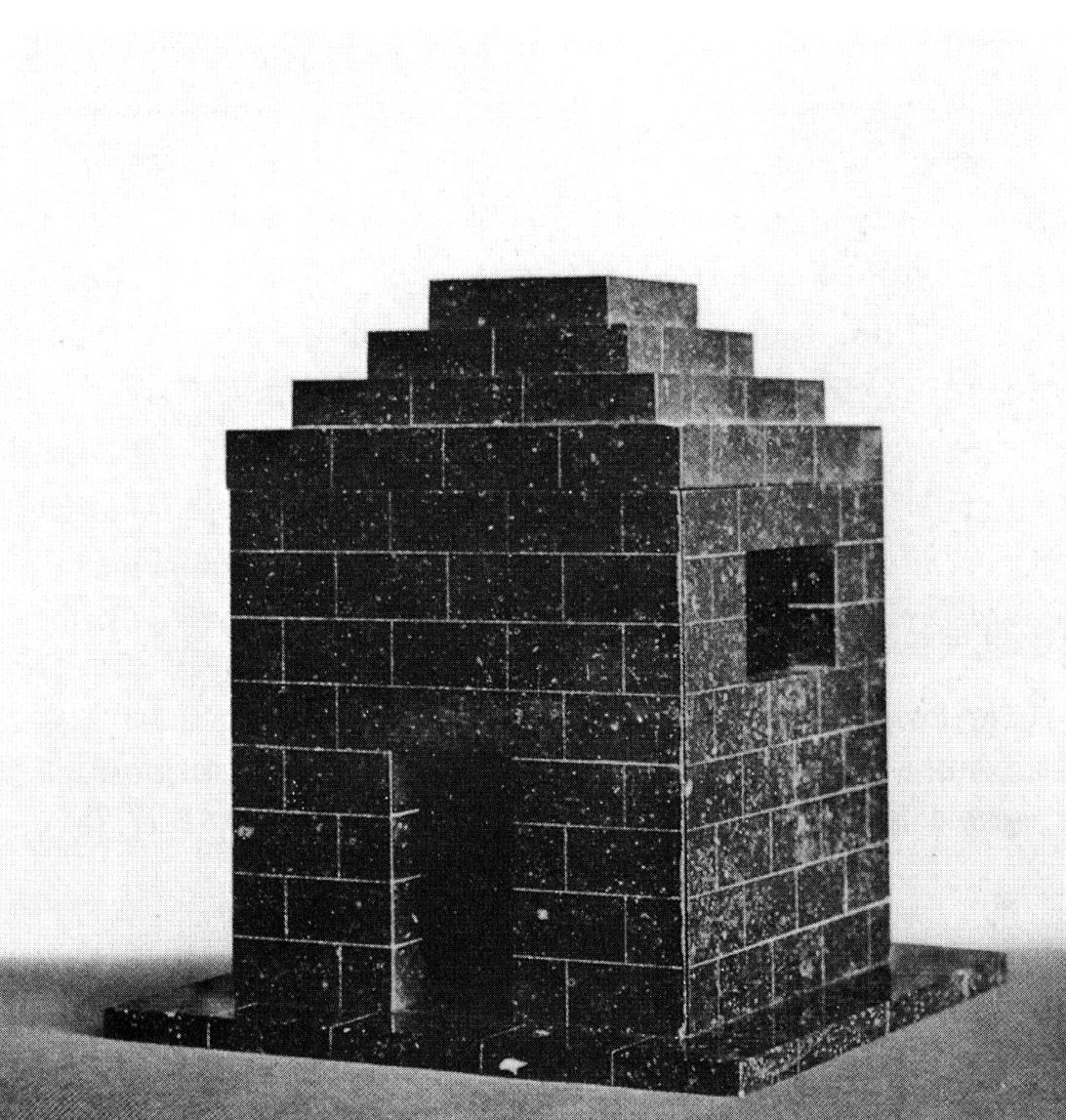
Model of Adolf Loos's Dvořák mausoleum

Adolf Loos's Dvořák mausoleum was a planned mausoleum in 1921 by the Austrian architect Adolf Loos for the Austrian Czech art historian Max Dvořák, who had died earlier that year. The mausoleum was never built.

In a 1910 essay, Architecture, Loos wrote that "...only a very small part of architecture belongs to the realm of art: The tomb and the monument".

Loos died in 1933. His own tomb was based on a design that he had sketched two years previously, consisting of a square of gray granite.

== Design ==
The mausoleum is shaped as a square chamber made of blocks of Swedish black granite, with blocks also forming a roof in a ziggurat. It was to be 20 feet high. The interior was to be decorated with frescoes by Oskar Kokoschka.

In his book Adolf Loos: The Art of Architecture, writer Joseph Masheck draws parallels between Loos's mausoleum and the work of later post-modern architects and artists including the brick installations of Carl Andre, the "gray prisms" of sculptor Robert Morris and the sculptures of Tony Smith, the last of which was an influence on I. M. Pei. In his 2006 book Prosthetic Gods, critic Hal Foster wrote that the simple design of Loos's mausoleum alluded to Mausolus's Mausoleum at Halicarnassus.

Neil H. Donahue, in his book on art historian Wilhelm Worringer, Invisible Cathedrals: The Expressionist Art History of Wilhelm Worringer, describes the mausoleum as possessing an "innate severity of cubical massing serving an expressive purpose of spiritual gravity".

== Re-creation ==
A scale version of the mausoleum was realised by the British architect Sam Jacob as a temporary installation called A Very Small Part of Architecture commissioned by the Architecture Foundation at London's Highgate Cemetery in September 2016.
