= Čížkovice =

- Municipality
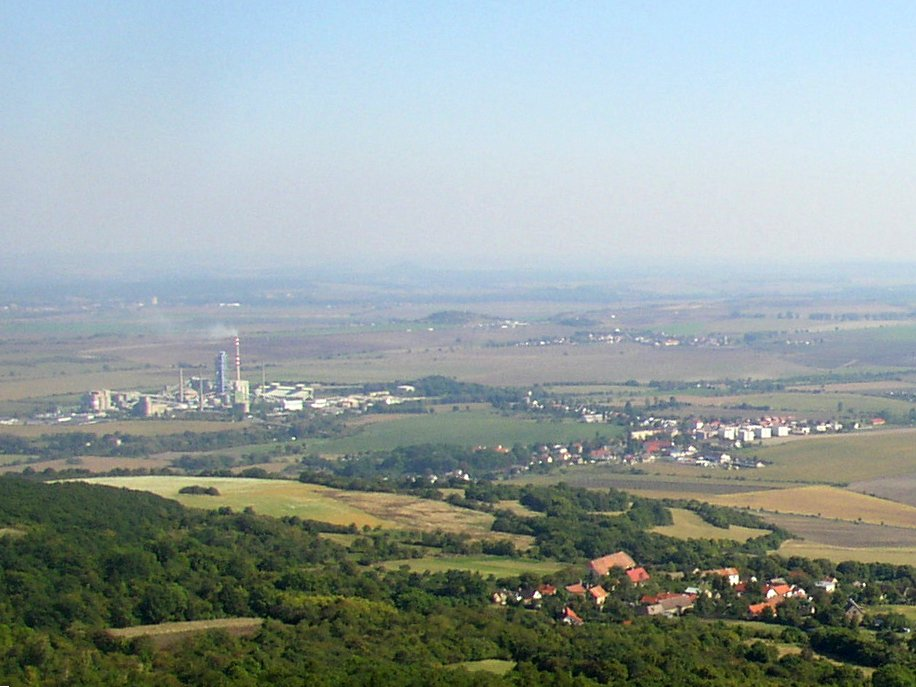
- Čížkovice as seen from west

- Flag Coat of arms

- Location in the Czech Republic
- Coordinates: 50°29′3″N 14°1′43″E
- Country: Czech Republic
- Region: Ústí nad Labem
- District: Litoměřice
- First mentioned: 1276

Area
  - Total: 7.06 km^{2} (2.73 sq mi)
- Elevation: 175 m (574 ft)

Population (2026-01-01)
  - Total: 1,512
  - Density: 214/km^{2} (555/sq mi)
- Time zone: UTC+1 (CET)
  - Summer (DST): UTC+2 (CEST)
- Postal code: 411 12
- Website: www.cizkovice.cz

Čížkovice (German: Tschischkowitz) is a municipality and village in Litoměřice District in the Ústí nad Labem Region of the Czech Republic. It has about 1,500 inhabitants.

Čížkovice lies approximately 9 kilometres (6 mi) south-west of Litoměřice, 20 km (12 mi) south of Ústí nad Labem, and 53 km (33 mi) north-west of Prague.

== Administrative division ==
Čížkovice consists of two municipal parts (in brackets population according to the 2021 census):

- Čížkovice (1,304)
- Želechovice (96)

== Demographics ==
Historical population
Year	Pop.	±%
1869	774	—
1880	884	+14.2%
1890	875	−1.0%
1900	1,117	+27.7%
1910	1,306	+16.9%
1921	1,222	−6.4%
1930	1,346	+10.1%
1950	1,048	−22.1%
1961	1,063	+1.4%
1970	1,160	+9.1%
1980	1,358	+17.1%
1991	1,307	−3.8%
2001	1,312	+0.4%
2011	1,374	+4.7%
2021	1,400	+1.9%
Source: Censuses

== Notable people ==
- Moritz Thausing (1838–1884), Austrian art historian
