= Hans Sedlmayr =

Austrian art historian

Hans Sedlmayr (18 January 1896, in Szarvkő, Kingdom of Hungary – 9 July 1984, in Salzburg) was an Austrian art historian. From 1931 to 1932 and from 1938 onwards, he was a member of the Nazi Party.

== Positions as a University Professor ==
Sedlmayr held a chair in art history at the University of Vienna from 1936 until 1945, then at the Ludwig-Maximilians-Universität München from 1951 until 1964.

In 1964 he was appointed as professor at the University of Salzburg, where he established the art history curriculum.

== Marriages and Family Life ==
After the loss of his first wife, Helene Fritz, in 1943 he married Maria von Schmedes, a well-known Austrian singer, whose discography contains many titles published in Nazi Germany. In 1951, their only daughter Susanna was born.

== Education ==
Sedlmayr first studied architecture at Vienna's Technische Hochschule between 1918 and 1920. Afterward, he continued his education at the University of Vienna, where he studied art history under Max Dvořák, until Dvořák's death in 1921. He continued at the University of Vienna under Dvořák's successor, Julius von Schlosser, who advised Sedlmayr's dissertation on the Austrian baroque architect, Johann Bernhard Fischer von Erlach, which was published in 1925.

There were considerable protests against his taking up his job in Munich in 1951, all referring to his involvement with the Nazi regime. Sedlmayr was a strong supporter of the preservation of the old town in Salzburg. He stressed the importance of studying art and architecture in their historical and social context. He specialized in the study of Baroque architecture and wrote a book on the churches of Francesco Borromini. A founding member of the New Vienna School of art history alongside Otto Pächt, which based itself on the writings of Alois Riegl, he wrote a manifesto in 1931 called Zu einer strengen Kunstwissenschaft ("Toward a Rigorous Study of Art"). In this text, Sedlmayr calls on the discipline of art history to move past empirical research, and he introduces a 'second', interpretive method of art historical analysis that would discern the aesthetic nature of the artwork. This method of art history is known as Strukturforschung (structure research) or Strukturanalyse (structure analysis). He is the author of Verlust der Mitte: Die bildende Kunst des 19. und 20. Jahrhunderts als Symptom und Symbol der Zeit (1948, "Loss of the Center: the Fine Arts of the Nineteenth and Twentieth Centuries as Symptom and Symbol of the Times"), published in English in 1957 as Art in Crisis: The Lost Center. In this book, Sedlmayr offers a "critique" of the spirit of the 19th Century, as revealed through the artwork created during that time period.

== Sedlmayr and the Nazi Era ==
He was a member of the Austrian Nazi Party from 1931 onwards. Some sources date the beginning of his membership as early as 1930.

One source claims that he left the party when the “first news of the camps arrived”.

More recent Austrian research, however, strongly questions this interpretation. Herwig Gottwald, Professor of German Philology at Salzburg University, even claims in an article for the Vienna Daily, Der Standard that in Spring 1939, Sedlmayr advocated the building of an Adolf Hitler city on the ruins of the mainly Jewish Second Vienna district, Leopoldstadt, traditionally the home of Vienna's Jewry, sent to the concentration camps during this period.

Upon hearing the news of the assassination attempt by Johann Georg Elser against Adolf Hitler on 8 November 1939, Sedlmayr saluted his students during his lecture with the Hitler salute and called on his students at Vienna University to defeat the enemy and to denounce any attempt of resistance against the Nazi regime to the “police”, i.e. the Gestapo, and that he himself did so recently.

In 1944, he even became a member of the academic legion of the Higher SS and Police Directorate in Vienna.

Following World War II he was expelled from the University and lost his position at the University of Vienna as a result of his Nazi activities, although he was not prosecuted by the Allies.

In 1946, he began to publish in the Catholic review Wort und Wahrheit ("Word and Truth") under the pseudonym Hans Schwartz.

“Wort und Wahrheit” was a post-WW2 Austrian Catholic Journal, which on the one hand published articles by such authors as Erika Weinzierl, well-known for their anti-Nazi-attitudes, on the other hand it also frequently published articles by such authors as Josef Nadler and Taras Borodajkewycz.

His most well-known work, “Verlust der Mitte”, although it does not use explicitly the Nazi term “Entartete Kunst”, constantly refers to the decline of art in the wake of the Enlightenment and thus must be seen in the larger framework of the anti-Enlightenment ideology of Nazism and radical anti-Enlightenment Catholicism. Recent Austrian research has also revealed that its first German edition was edited by Taras Borodajkewycz, the most important figure in the history of Austrian postwar Antisemitism.
