= Otto Benesch =

Austrian art historian (1896–1964)

Otto Benesch (29 June 1896 in Ebenfurth – 16 November 1964 in Vienna) was an Austrian art historian. He was taught by Max Dvořák and is considered a member of the Vienna School of Art History. He is well known for his catalogue of Rembrandt's drawings. In 1942 he was awarded the Guggenheim Fellowship.

== Life and work ==
Benesch was the son of art collector Heinrich Benesch, an important patron of the Austrian artist Egon Schiele. Being familiar with modern art from childhood, a personal acquaintance with Schiele left a lasting impression on him, which is also to be seen in several of his publications.

From 1915 to 1921, Benesch studied art history, archaeology and philosophy at the University of Vienna mainly under Max Dvořák. In 1921 he wrote his PhD dissertation on the development of Rembrandt's drawing. From 1920 to 1923, he volunteered at the Art Gallery of the Kunsthistorisches Museum, Vienna. In 1923, he became an assistant and later curator of the collection of the Albertina, where he classified the Rembrandt collection and also curated exhibitions. He lost this job during the Nazi era, because his wife was of Jewish ancestry. Therefore, in 1938, he emigrated to France, in 1939 to England, and in 1940 to the USA. From 1940 to 1947, he lived in Cambridge, Massachusetts, and worked at Harvard's Fogg Museum, Cambridge, Massachusetts; at Princeton University; and in New York City. In Princeton, he was a member of the Institute for Advanced Study. In 1947, he was appointed back to Vienna, where he served as Director of the Albertina and curated many important exhibitions. In 1948 he was also appointed extraordinary professor of art history. He retired in 1961.

Benesch's work focused on the graphic arts and Rembrandt. His further interests covered gothic art, the conservation of monuments, art theory and even musicology.

Benesch was an Officer of the Legion of Honor and was decorated with the Orders of Orange‐Nassau and Leopold II, and the Austrian Cross of Honor for Science and Art.

"Max Dvořák", he said, "introduced me to the strict and pragmatic spirit which regards the history of art as a historical discipline, far removed from all aesthetic assayism. The sole foundation of this scientific method of approach is the view that the work of art is a statement and the literary evidence its meaningfully interpreted source."

He wrote of Rembrandt's religious convictions: "Life itself was something sacred to Rembrandt, independent of its religious or profane content. Life was to him, first of all, life of the soul, eloquence and expressiveness of man."

== Select publications ==
- "Die Wiener kunsthistorische Schule," Österreichische Rundschau (1920).
- Beschreibender Katalog der Handzeichnungen der Graphischen Sammlung Albertina, 2 vols., Vienna 1929–33.
- "Rijn, Rembrandt Harmensz van." In Allgemeines Lexikon der bildenden Künstler von der Antike bis zur Gegenwart. Leipzig 1907–50, Vol. 29, pp. 259–271.
- Der Maler Albrecht Altdorfer. Vienna 1939.
- Artistic and Intellectual Trends from Rubens to Daumier as Shown in Book Illustration. Cambridge, Massachusetts 1943.
- The Art of the Renaissance in Northern Europe: Its Relation to the Contemporary Spiritual and Intellectual Movements. Cambridge, Massachusetts 1945. Reprinted Hamden, Conn. 1964.
- Kleine Geschichte der Kunst in Österreich. Vienna 1950.
- Egon Schiele as a Draughtsman. Vienna 1950.
- The Drawings of Rembrandt. A Critical and Chronological Catalogue. 6 vols., London 1954–57.
- Die Historia Friderici et Maximiliani. Berlin 1957.
- Edvard Munch. Garden City, NY 1960.
- Collected Writings, edited by Eva Benesch, 4 vols., New York 1970–73.
- From an Art Historian's Workshop. Luzern 1979.
