= Vienna School of Art History =

The Vienna School of Art History (German: Wiener Schule der Kunstgeschichte) was the development of fundamental art-historical methods at the University of Vienna. This school was not actually a dogmatically unified group, but rather an intellectual evolution extending over a number of generations, in which a series of outstanding scholars each built upon the achievements of their forerunners, while contributing their own unique perspectives. Essential elements of this evolution became fundamental for modern art history, even if the individual methods can today no longer claim absolute validity.

A characteristic trait of the Vienna School was the attempt to put art history on a "scientific" ("wissenschaftlich") basis by distancing art historical judgements from questions of aesthetic preference and taste, and by establishing rigorous concepts of analysis through which all works of art could be understood. Nearly all of the important representatives of the Vienna School combined academic careers as university teachers with curatorial activity in museums or with the preservation of monuments.

The concept of a Viennese "school" of art history was first employed by the Czech art critic and collector Vincenc Kramář in 1910; it attained general currency following articles published by Otto Benesch in 1920 and by Julius von Schlosser in 1934. In the following entry it has only been possible to make cursory mention of the most important representatives of the school.

== History ==
=== Pragmatic art history ===
Rudolf Eitelberger is considered to have been the "forefather" of the Vienna School. He acquired a profound knowledge of art through private study during the Vormärz, and in 1852 was appointed as the first professor of art history at the University of Vienna. His greatest concern was to render the aesthetic appreciation of art more objective through giving weight to historical sources and demonstrable facts. He perceived art-historical research as an absolute prerequisite for the elevation of taste and for the improvement of contemporary art. On account of this goal-oriented attitude he became one of the most important protagonists in the historicist movement in Austrian art and architecture.

The first graduate of the Eitelberger's new program in art history was Moritz Thausing, who in 1879 became the second Ordinarius (full professor) of art history at Vienna. He advanced beyond his teacher's program in his advocacy of an autonomous art history and promoted the separation of art history from aesthetics.

=== Formalist art history ===
Thausing's students Franz Wickhoff (Professor 1891) and Alois Riegl (Professor 1897) furthered his approach, insofar as they developed the methods of comparative stylistic analysis and attempted to avoid all judgements of personal taste. Thus both contributed to the revaluation of the art of late antiquity, which before then had been despised as a period of decline. Riegl in particular, as an avowed disciple of positivism, focused on the purely formal qualities of the work of art, and rejected all arguments about content as metaphysical speculation.

=== Idealist art history ===
After the early deaths of Riegl and Wickhoff, one of the art-historical positions at the university was filled by Max Dvořák, who at first continued the tradition of his predecessors. However, Dvořák's interest gradually turned towards issues of content; that is, to precisely those issues that, for Riegl, were not the object of art history. Dvořák, in part influenced by the contemporary expressionist movement in German painting, developed a deep appreciation for the unclassical formal qualities of Mannerism. Dvořák's idealistic method, which would later be termed "Kunstgeschichte als Geistesgeschichte" ("art history as intellectual history"), found its most committed champions in Hans Tietze and Otto Benesch.

=== Structuralist art history ===
Dvořák also died young, and in 1922 Julius von Schlosser was appointed as his successor. Schlosser embodied the type of the classical, humanistic scholar, and nourished a deep attachment to the art and culture of Italy throughout his life. He was a close friend of the Italian philosopher Benedetto Croce and of Karl Vossler, a Munich-based professor of the Romance languages, under whose influence he developed an art-historical method based on philological models. He drew a distinction between the "Stilgeschichte" ("style-history") of brilliant artists and their unique creations, and the "Sprachgeschichte" ("language-history") of the fine arts, which latter embraced the entire spectrum of artistic creation. Among those to emerge from Schlosser's school, besides Fritz Saxl, Ernst Gombrich and Otto Kurz, were Hans Sedlmayr and Otto Pächt, who in the 1930s founded art-historical "structuralism." Their methodology was described by Meyer Schapiro as the "New Vienna School"; it has also been described as the "Second Vienna School."

=== Ideological art history ===
Josef Strzygowski, who was appointed in 1909, at the same time as Dvořák, holds a unique position in the history of the Vienna School. He was a vehement opponent of the traditional view of history, in place of which he advocated an anticlassical, antihumanist, and anticlerical outlook. In opposition to the standard view of history, which was centered on ancient Greece and Rome, Strzygowski turned his attention towards the Orient, where he thought he had discovered the traces of an original "Nordic" character, which was superior to the "Mediterranean." As he held such a single-minded point of view, he found himself in irreconcilable opposition to the "orthodox" branch of the Vienna School, in particular to the "arch-humanist" Schlosser, who on his side condemned Strzygowski as the "Attila of art history." The dispute resulted in a complete separation, not only ideological but also physical, so that two art-historical institutes existed within the university without any relationship to each other. As Strzygowski could naturally not allow himself to adopt the methods of his opponents, he devised a tabular method of "Planforschung," which was supposed to guarantee absolute objectivity, but in hindsight was completely impracticable and clearly intended to justify his abstruse theories. Strzygowski's worldview developed a markedly bizarre, racist tendency that approached Nazi ideology. However, his institute was closed upon his retirement in 1933. Nevertheless, he is to be credited with the expansion of the boundaries of western art history, which he opened to the consideration of non-European cultures. Moreover, his esteem for abstract art, which he understood as uniquely "Nordic," was a step towards an art-historical confrontation with modernity. With all due care, then, Strzygowski may also find his proper place today in the history of the Vienna School.

=== Synthesis ===
The era of Nazism signified a turning point for the Vienna School. Numerous scholars were forced to emigrate and came into contact with the methodological approaches of other nations, in particular in the Anglo-American world. Hans Sedlmayr, a declared Nazi, led the institute throughout the war, and at war's end his career in Vienna likewise came to an end. In 1946, Karl Maria Swoboda assumed leadership of the Insitut, where he constructed a synthesis of the previously irreconcilable schools of Schlosser and Strzygowski, now drained of their ideological intransigence. In 1963 two Ordinarius positions were once more created, and were filled by Otto Pächt (a student of Schlosser) and Otto Demus (a student of Strzygowski). Under the "two Ottos" Vienna became a "Mekka der Mittelalterkunstgeschichte" ("a mecca for medieval art history"), while also offering excellent coverage of post-medieval art through the appointment of Fritz Novotny. Today Werner Hoffmann, who developed the traditions of the school and adapted them for an intellectual engagement with contemporary art, may count as the youngest heir of the Vienna School.

== Sources ==
This article is substantially based on the equivalent entry in the German Wikipedia.

== Selected literature ==
- Vincenc Kramář, "Videňská Škola Dějin Umění," Volné Směry (1910).
- Otto Benesch, "Die Wiener kunsthistorische Schule," Österreichische Rundschau (1920).
- Julius von Schlosser, "Die Wiener Schule der Kunstgeschichte: Rückblick auf ein Säkulum deutscher Gelehrtenarbeit in Österreich," Mitteilungen des Österreichischen Instituts für Geschichtsforschung 13 (1934).
- Meyer Schapiro, "The New Viennese School," Art Bulletin 18 (1936).
- Dagobert Frey, "Bemerkungen zur Wiener Schule der Kunstwissenschaft." In Dagobert Frey, Eine Erinnerungsschrift. Kiel 1962, pp. 5–15.
- Wien und die Entwicklung der kunsthistorischen Methode. Akten des XXV. Internationalen Kongresses für Kunstgeschichte 1983, 1 (Vienna, 1984).
- Thomas Zaunschirm, "Kunstgeschichte als Geistesgeschichte. Eine andere Wiener Schule". In Das grössere Österreich. Edited by Kristian Sotriffer. Vienna 1982, pp. 162–164.
- Werner Hofmann, "Was bleibt von der Wiener Schule?" Kunsthistoriker, 1–2, 1984–1985, No. 1, pp. 4–8.
- Edwin Lachnit, "Ansätze methodischer Evolution in der Wiener Schule der Kunstgeschichte." In L'art et les révolutions, 5: Révolution et évolution de l'histoire de l'art de Warburg á nos jours. Actes du XXVIIème congrès international d'histoire de l'art, Strasbourg, September 1–7, 1989. Strasbourg 1992, pp. 43–52.
- Christopher S. Wood, The Vienna School Reader: politics and art historical method in the 1930s (New York, 2000).
- Martin Seiler, "Empirische Motive im Denken und Forschen der Wiener Schule der Kunstgeschichte." In Kunst, Kunsttheorie und Kunstforschung im wissenschaftlichen Diskurs. In memoriam Kurt Blaukopf. Edited by Martin Seiler and Friedrich Stadler. Vienna 2000, pp. 49–86.
- Wiener Schule - Erinnerungen und Perspektiven. Wiener Jahrbuch für Kunstgeschichte 53 (2004).
- Edwin Lachnit, Die Wiener Schule der Kunstgeschichte und die Kunst ihrer Zeit. Zum Verhältnis von Methode und Forschungsgegenstand am Beginn der Moderne (Vienna, 2005).
- Matthew Rampley, The Vienna School of Art History. Empire and the Politics of Scholarship (University Park, 2013).
- Ján Bakoš, Discourses and Strategies: The Role of the Vienna School in Shaping Central European Approaches to Art History & Related Discourses. Frankfurt am Main 2014.
