= Stilfragen =

1893 book by Alois Riegl

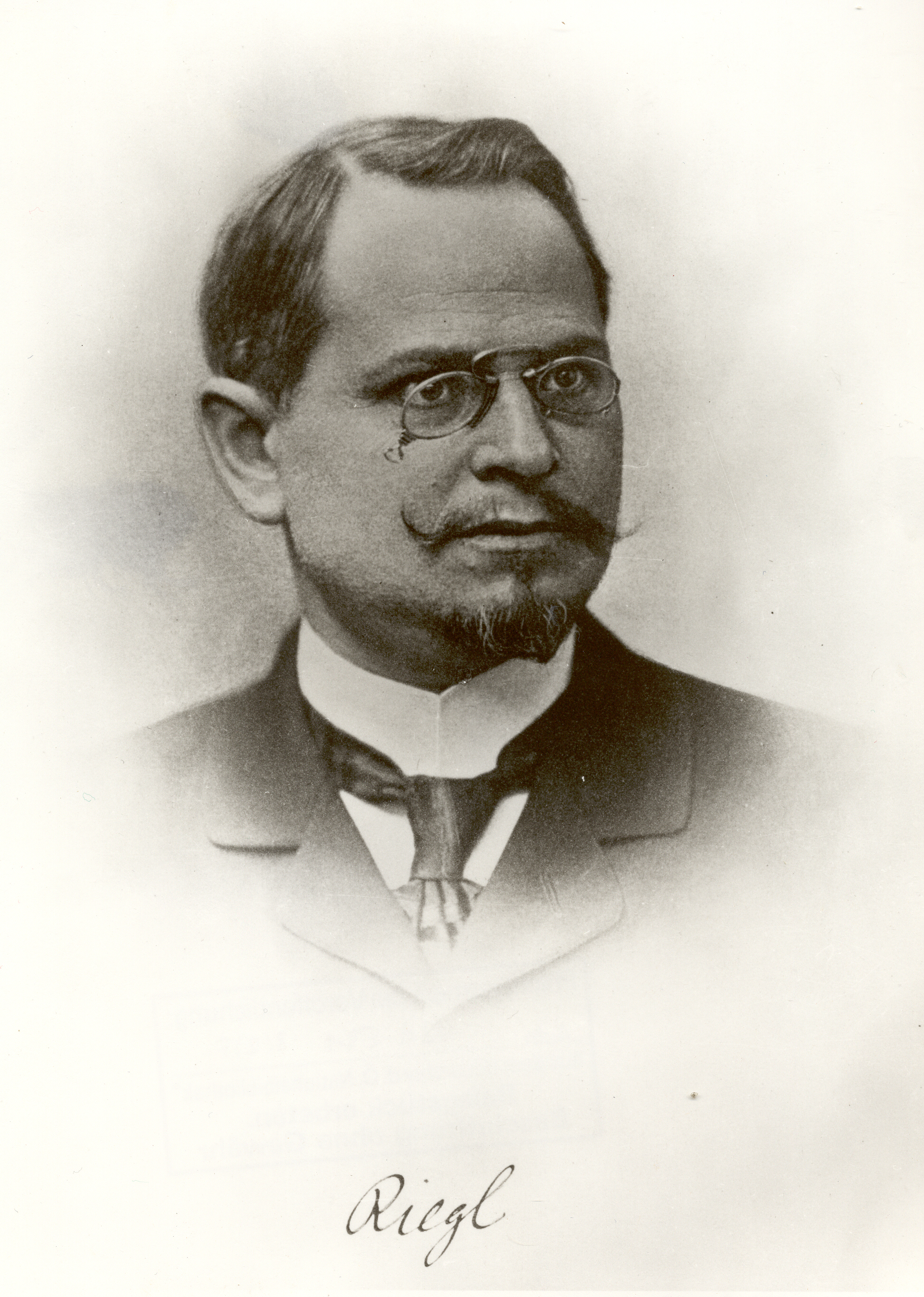
Alois Riegl, c. 1890

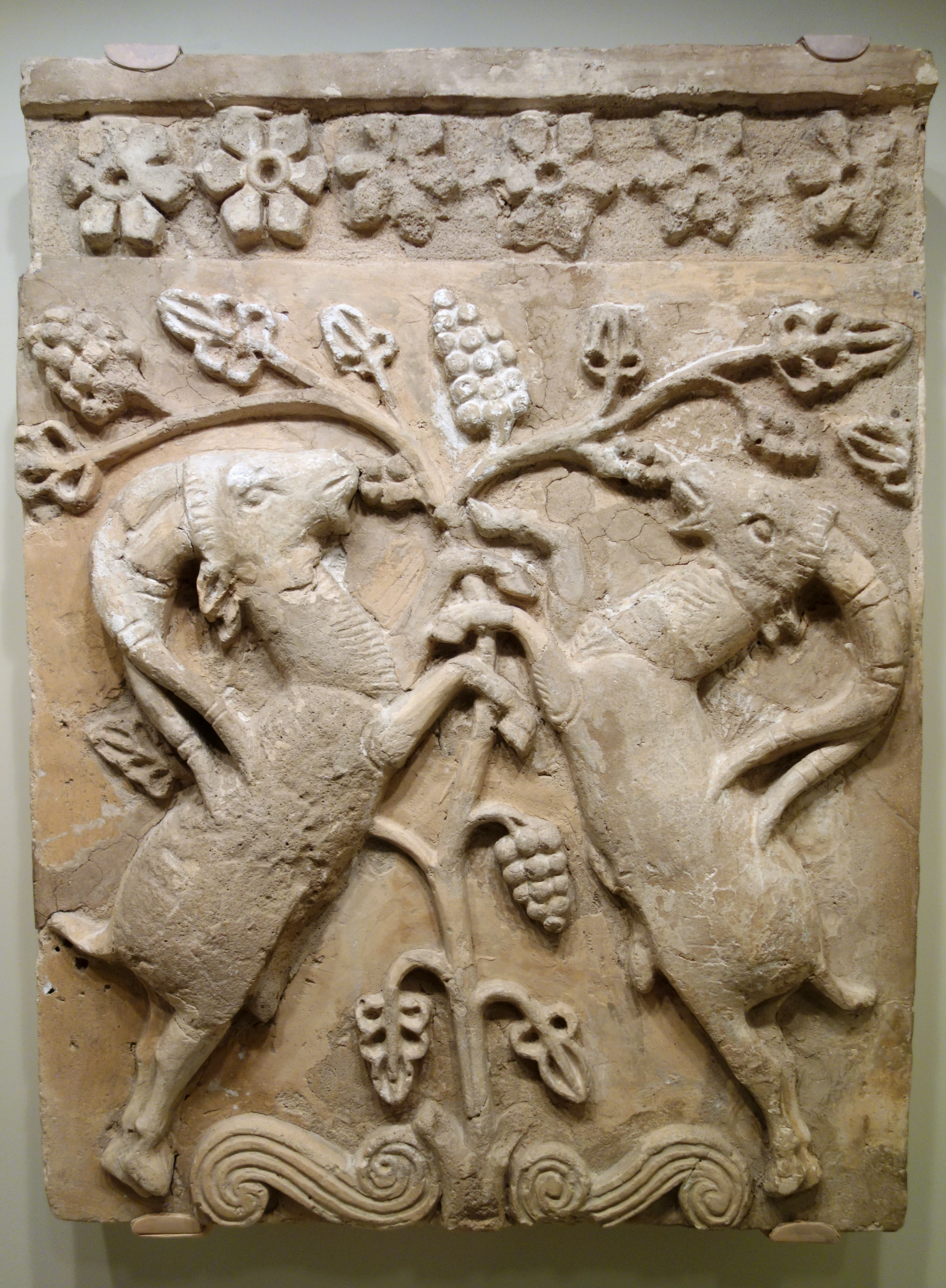
Confronted animals, here ibexes, flank a Tree of Life. Iran, Sasanian period, 5th or 6th century AD, stucco originally with polychrome painting.

Stilfragen: Grundlegungen zu einer Geschichte der Ornamentik is a book on the history of ornament by the Austrian art historian Alois Riegl. It was published in Berlin in 1893. The English translation renders the title as Problems of style: foundations for a history of ornament, although this has been criticized by some. (Note: For example, Benjamin Binstock, "Alois Riegl, Monumental Ruin," in A. Riegl, Historical Grammar of the Visual Arts (New York, 2004), p.35 n.28: "Evelyn Kain's translation of what she strangely calls Problems of Style is unsatisfactory; it is not simply a question (or problem) of style." See also Kathryn Brush's review of the translation, Art Bulletin 74 (1994), p. 355: "Riegl wrote Stilfragen, or Questions of style (curiously entitled Problems of Style in the 1992 English translation) during the 1890s....") It has been called "the one great book ever written about the history of ornament."

Riegl wrote the Stilfragen while employed as director of the textile department at what was then the Österreichisches Museum für Kunst und Industrie (today the Museum für angewandte Kunst) in Vienna. His primary intention was to argue that it was possible to write a continuous history of ornament. This position is argued in explicit opposition to that of the "technical-materialist" school, according to which "all art forms were always the direct products of materials and techniques" and that ornamental "motifs originated spontaneously throughout the world at a number of different locations." Riegl associates this view with the followers of Gottfried Semper, who had advanced a related argument in his Der Stil in den technischen Künsten; oder praktischer Ästhetik (Style in the technical arts; or practical aesthetics, 1878–79). However, Riegl consistently disassociates Semper's followers from Semper himself, writing that

The theory of the technical, materialist origin of the earliest ornaments is usually attributed to Gottfried Semper. This association is, however, no more justified than the one made between contemporary Darwinism and Darwin.

As the technical-materialist position had attained the status of dogma, Riegl stated that "the most pressing problem that confronts historians of the decorative arts today is to reintegrate the historical thread that has been severed into a thousand pieces." Accordingly, he argued for a continuous development of ornament from ancient Egyptian through Greek and Roman and up to early Islamic and, eventually, Ottoman art.

== Contents ==
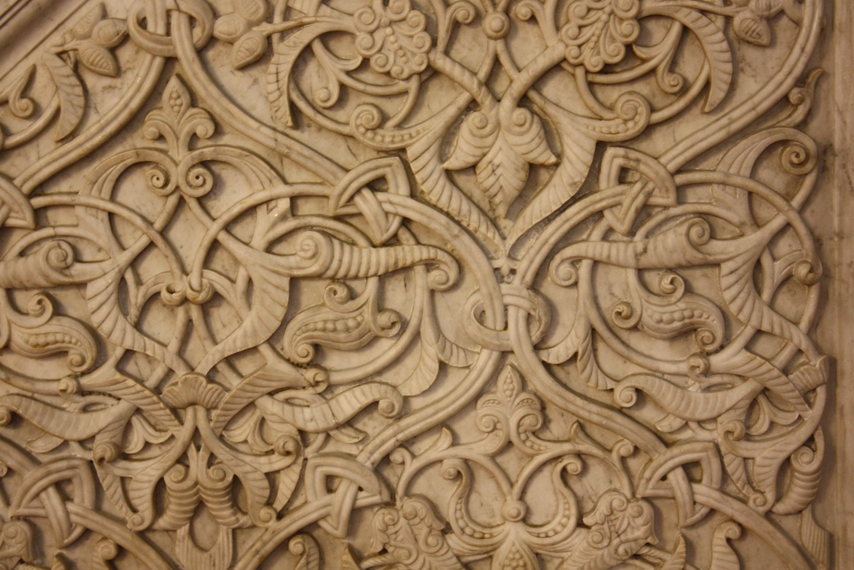
Stone relief with arabesques of tendrils, palmettes and half-palmettes in the Umayyad Mosque, Damascus

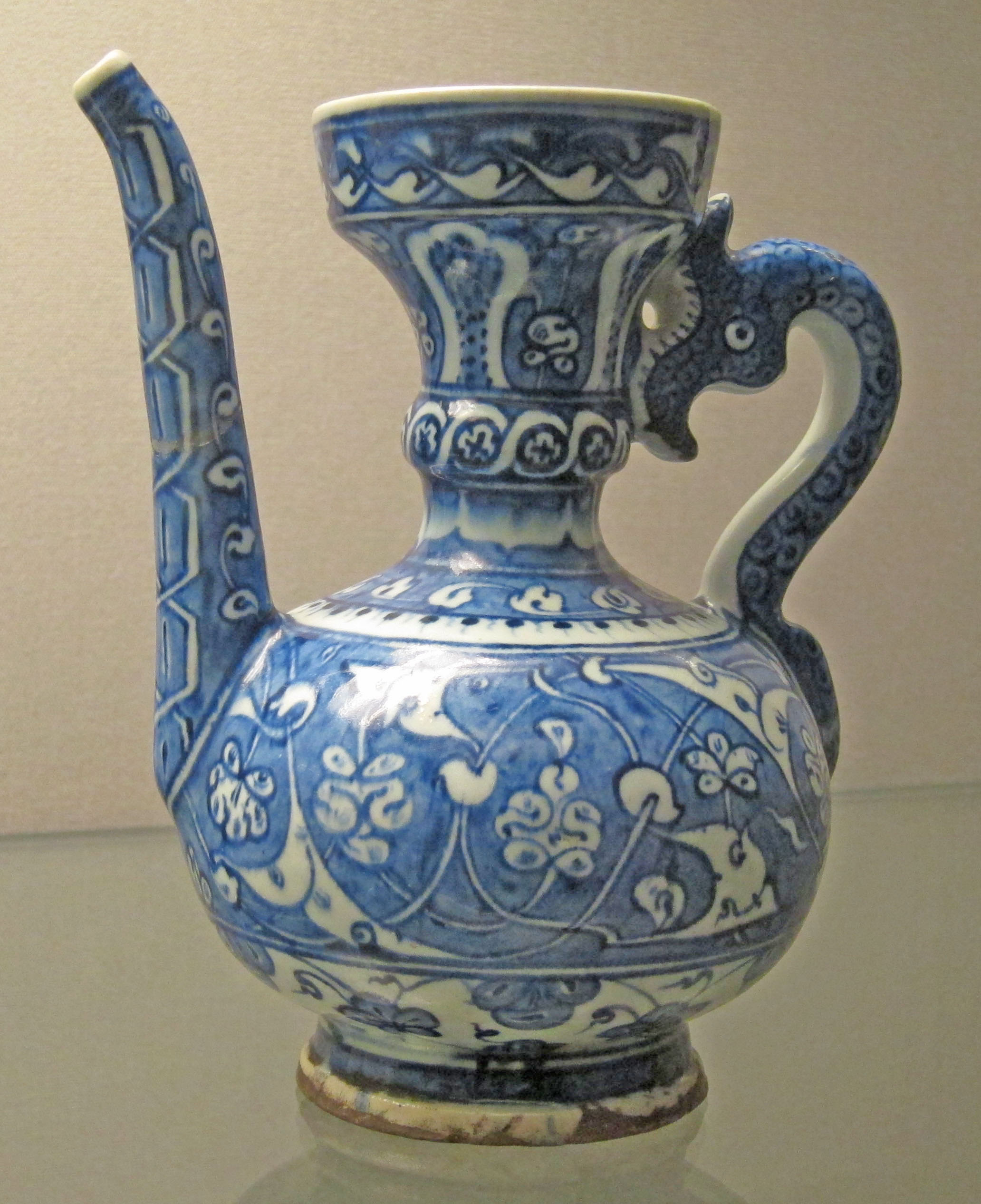
'Abraham of Kütahya ewer', probably made in Kütahya, dated 1510. Ottoman İznik pottery

The Stilfragen is divided into an introduction, which sets out the purpose of the work, and four chapters, each on a theme in the history of artistic style.

The first chapter, "The Geometric Style," argues that geometric ornament originated, not from such technical processes as wickerwork and weaving, but rather from an "immanent artistic drive, alert and restless for action, that human beings possessed long before they invented woven protective coverings for their bodies." He supported this position through an analysis of geometric ornament in Stone Age European art, in particular objects that had recently been discovered in the Dordogne. This ornament, he argued, developed from attempts to represent natural forms in two dimensions, which gave rise to the idea of an outline. After this "invention of line," the cave-dwellers proceeded to arrange lines "according to the principles of rhythm and symmetry."

The second chapter, "The Heraldic Style," addresses compositions of "paired animals arranged symmetrically to either side of an intervening central element." This type of decoration had been associated by previous scholars, most notably Ernst Curtius, with the technical demands of silk-weaving. Riegl argued instead that heraldic ornament arose before the invention of mechanical weaving-looms, and stemmed from a desire for symmetry.

The third chapter, "The Introduction of Vegetal Ornament and the Development of the Ornamental Tendril," traces an unbroken evolution of vegetal ornament from ancient Egyptian through to late Roman art. Here Riegl argues that motifs such as the lotus flower, although they may originally have been endowed by the Egyptians with symbolic significance, were adopted by other cultures that "no longer understood their hieratic meaning," and thereby became purely decorative. In the most famous section of this chapter, Riegl argued that acanthus ornament was not derived from the acanthus plant, as had been believed since the time of Vitruvius, but was rather a sculptural adaptation of the palmette motif. It was therefore "a product of pure artistic invention," and not of "a simple compulsion to make direct copies of living organisms."

The fourth chapter, "The Arabesque," continues the development of the previous chapter through late antique and early Byzantine and into Islamic art. The arabesque is understood here as a geometricized version of earlier systems of tendril ornament, thereby establishing a "genetic relationship between the ornamental Islamic tendril and its direct predecessor, the tendril ornament of antiquity."

The final two chapters are therefore presented as a continuous history of vegetal ornament from ancient Egypt through to Ottoman Turkey, in which individual motifs develop according to purely artistic criteria, and not through the intervention of technical or mimetic concerns. In the introduction it is suggested that this development could be continued to Riegl's own time, and that "ornament experiences the same continuous, coherent development that prevails in the art of all periods."

== Significance ==
The Stilfragen remains a fundamental work in the history of ornament, and has heavily influenced the work of Paul Jacobsthal and Ernst Gombrich, among others who have addressed the same themes.

Within Riegl's work as a whole, the Stilfragen constitutes his earliest general statement of principles, although his "theoretical thinking had not by any means reached maturity." By severing stylistic development from external influences, such as technical procedures or a desire to imitate nature, Riegl raised an extremely complicated set of questions regarding the actual source and significance of stylistic change. As Otto Pächt has written:

In the picture that Riegl draws of the development the changes of style are meaningful in a specific way; continuity is not merely carrying on; every stylistic phase creates its own problems which are solved in the succeeding one, only to create new conflicts for which new answers have to be found. Thus the styles change of necessity, or to put it differently: in a kind of 'retrospective prophecy' the art historian shows that artistic development was compelled to move in the direction in which in fact it did. A view with most serious implications. One of them was that if one viewed art history in this way, absolute aesthetic norms became obsolete and had to be dropped.

Thus the concerns of the Stilfragen led directly into those of Riegl's next major study, the Spätrömische Kunstindustrie (Late Roman art industry, 1901), in which he approached style change in late antiquity not as a symptom of decline, but as the result of positive artistic concerns.

== See also ==
- Scroll (art)
- Master of Animals

== Editions and translations ==
- German: Stilfragen: Grundlegungen zu einer Geschichte der Ornamentik. First edition, Berlin, George Siemens, 1893. Second edition, Berlin, Richard Carl Schmidt, 1923.
- English: Evelyn Kain, tr., Problems of style: foundations for a history of ornament. Princeton, Princeton University, 1992.
- French: Henri-Alexis Baatsch and Françoise Rolland, trs., Questions de style: fondements d'une histoire de l'ornementation. Paris, Hazan, 2002.
- Spanish: Federico Miguel Saller, tr. Problemas de estilo: Fundamentos para una historia de la ornamentación. Barcelona, Gustavo Gili, 1980.
