= Fritz Novotny =

Austrian art historian

Fritz Novotny (10 February 1903 in Vienna – 16 April 1983 in Vienna), was an Austrian art historian. He is considered a member of the Vienna School of Art History.

== Biography ==
Novotny studied art history at the University of Vienna under Josef Strzygowski, and wrote his dissertation on the Romanesque architectural sculpture in the apse of the Pfarrkirche ("parish church") in Schöngrabern, in Lower Austria. Beginning in 1927 he worked as an assistant at Strzygowski's institute. In 1937 he received his habilitation with a study of Cézanne und das Ende der wissenschaftlichen Perspektive (Cézanne and the end of scientific perspective), which became a standard study of the French painter and established Novotny as an internationally recognized expert on his work. As a result of this book, Novotny made the acquaintance of the painter Gerhart Frankl, whose own work was stylistically influenced by Cézanne, but had also struggled with his French forebear through his statements on the theory of art. A lifelong friendship between Novotny and Frankl developed out of this initially professional conversation, and the two maintained an extensive correspondence. When Frankl had to flee to England in 1938, he attempted to also bring Novotny out of Austria, which in the meantime had been annexed to Nazi Germany. However, Novotny did not wish to leave his aged mother and his ill sister behind, and so he decided to remain in Vienna. Despite his uncompromising anti-fascist attitude, in 1939 Novotny received a position at the Österreichische Galerie in Schloss Belvedere, where he served as interim director for two years immediately after the end of the war. From 1960 until 1968 he served again as director of the Galerie, where he mounted a series of well-attended exhibitions that introduced the population of Vienna to the great masters of modern painting. From 1948, Novotny taught at the University of Vienna as a Professor extraordinarius. On the occasion of his retirement in 1978, he was honored with the title of Professor ordinarius. As a board member of the Adalbert Stifter Society, Novotny occupied himself with the artistic works of the Austrian poet, and founded a small museum, which today forms a part of the Vienna Museum (the municipal museum of the city of Vienna).

Novotny's study of Cézanne has been described as "the most disciplined exercise in the formal-analytic method" that was associated with the Vienna School of Art History in the mid-20th century. In the English-speaking world, Novotny is best known for his volume on 19th-century art, published as part of the Pelican History of Art.

== Selected works ==
- Romanische Bauplastik in Österreich, 1930.
- Cézanne und das Ende der wissenschaftlichen Perspektive, 1938. Selections translated in C.S. Wood, ed., The Vienna School Reader: Politics and At Historical Method in the 1930s (New York, 2000), pp. 379–433.
- Adalbert Stifter als Maler, 1941.
- Die großen französischen Impressionisten, 1952; Reprinted 1995.
- Painting and Sculpture in Europe 1780 to 1880 (The Pelican History of Art), 1960.
- Über das „Elementare“ in der Kunstgeschichte, 1968.

== Sources ==
This entry is substantially based on the equivalent entry in the German Wikipedia.
