= Fritz Saxl =

Austrian art historian (1890–1948)

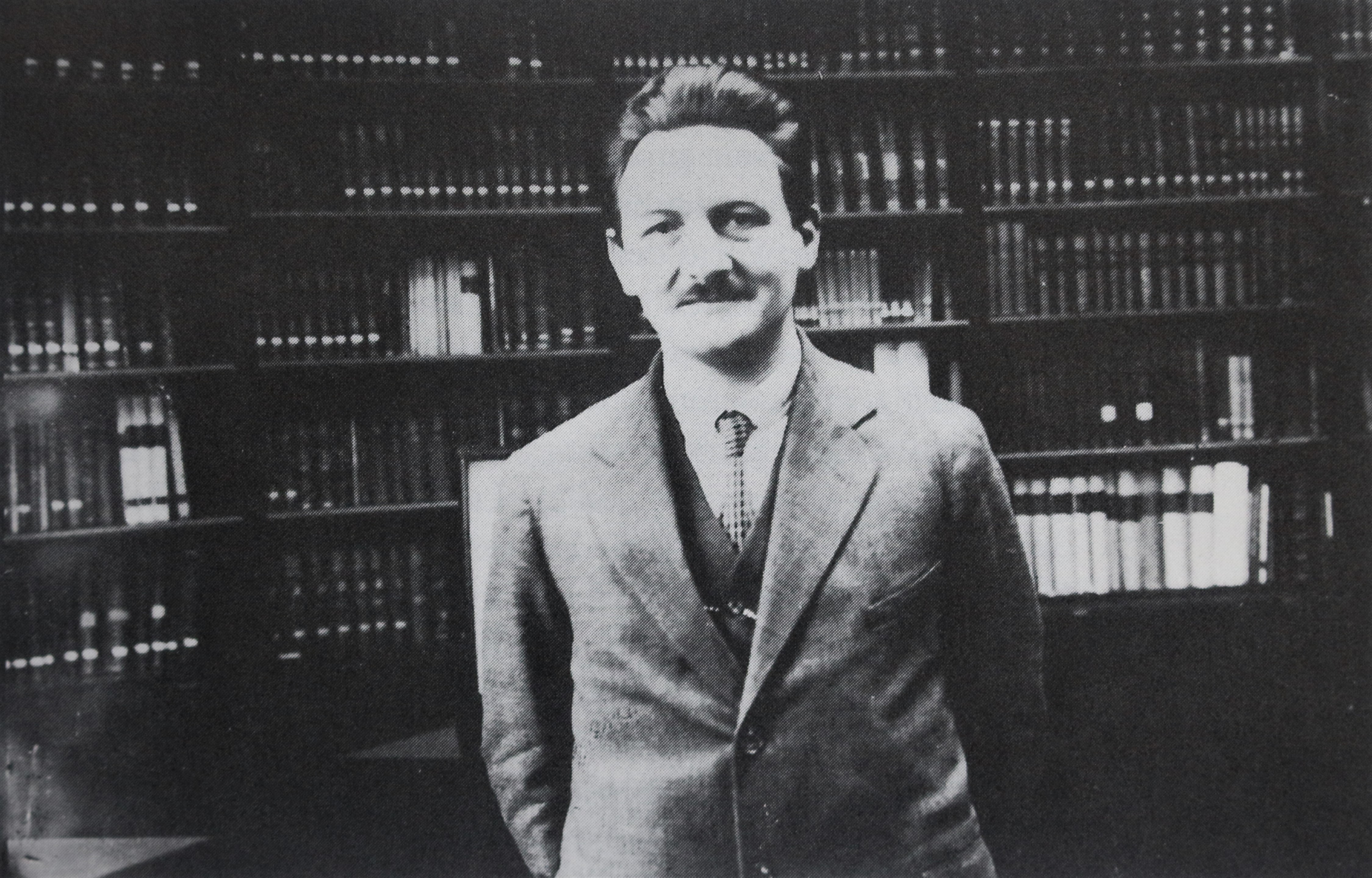
"Fritz" Saxl

Friedrich "Fritz" Saxl (8 January 1890, Vienna, Austria – 22 March 1948, Dulwich, London) was the art historian who was the guiding light of the Warburg Institute, especially during the long mental breakdown of its founder, Aby Warburg, whom he succeeded as director.

== Life and work ==
Saxl studied in his native Vienna under Franz Wickhoff, Julius von Schlosser and Max Dvořák, who oversaw his dissertation on Rembrandt.

Then in Berlin Saxl studied under Heinrich Wölfflin, and spent 1912–13 researching in Italy for his only major work, a study of medieval illuminated manuscripts with astrological and mythological elements, marrying Elise Bienenfeld in 1913. He served in the Austro-Hungarian army as a lieutenant on the Italian front for the duration of World War I.

In 1913 Fritz Saxl had joined what was then the Warburg Library at the Warburg Haus, Hamburg as librarian, and he returned in 1919, also lecturing at the University of Hamburg from 1923. On Warburg's death in 1929 Saxl formally became director, although he had effectively been in charge for several years already. With the Nazi regime in power, Saxl was instrumental in moving the Warburg Institute to safety in London in 1933, coming with it himself and settling in England, becoming a British citizen in 1940. His efforts at maintaining the Warburg Institute came at the cost of his own scholarly output, which was mostly restricted to papers and lectures.

In 1946 Saxl founded the Census of Antique Works of Art and Architecture Known in the Renaissance together with art historian Richard Krautheimer and archaeologist Karl Lehmann.

== Main published works ==
- Verzeichnis astrologischer und mythologischer illustrierter Handschriften des lateinischen Mittelalters. Vol. 1, Heidelberg: C. Winter, 1915, Vol. 2, Heidelberg: C. Winter, 1927, [Vols. 3 & 4, Meier, Hans, and Bober, Harry, and McGurk, Patrick.]
- English Sculpture of the 12th Century, London: Faber & Faber 1954
- Lectures. Vol. 1 & 2, London: Warburg Institute, 1957
- A Heritage of Images: A Selection of Lectures by Fritz Saxl. Introduction by E. H. Gombrich. Harmondsworth, Middlesex: Penguin, 1970
- The History of Warburg's Library. in: Gombrich, Aby Warburg. 2nd ed. Oxford : Phaidon Press, 1986, pp. 325–38
- Gebärde, Form, Ausdruck, vorgestellt von Pablo Schneider, Zürich-Berlin: diaphanes, 2010, ISBN 978-3-03734-131-5

=== Letters ===
- Ausreiten der Ecken. Die Aby Warburg – Fritz Saxl Korrespondenz 1910 bis 1919. Ed. Dorothea McEwan. Munich 1998. ISBN 3-930802-79-1.
- Wanderstrassen der Kultur. Die Aby Warburg – Fritz Saxl Korrespondenz 1920 bis 1929. Ed. Dorothea McEwan. Munich 2004. ISBN 3-935549-85-7
