= Otto Kurz =

Otto Kurz FBA (26 May 1908 in Vienna, Austria – 3 September 1975 in London) was a historian and Slade Professor of Fine Art, University of Oxford.

== Education ==
- University of Vienna

== Career ==
Fleeing to London from the Nazis, he was Librarian at the Warburg Institute, 1944–65 and Professor of the History of Classical Tradition with special reference to the Near East, University of London, 1965–75. He was Slade Professor of Fine Art at the University of Oxford for 1971–72.

== Honours ==
- He was Visiting Lecturer, Hebrew University, Jerusalem, 1964, and 1973
- He was elected a Fellow of the British Academy, 1962.
- Honorary Fellow: Associazione Francesco Francia, Bologna; Raccolta Vinciana, Milan; Accademia Clementina, Bologna.
