= Max Dvořák =

Czech-born Austrian art historian (1874-1921)

Max Dvorak
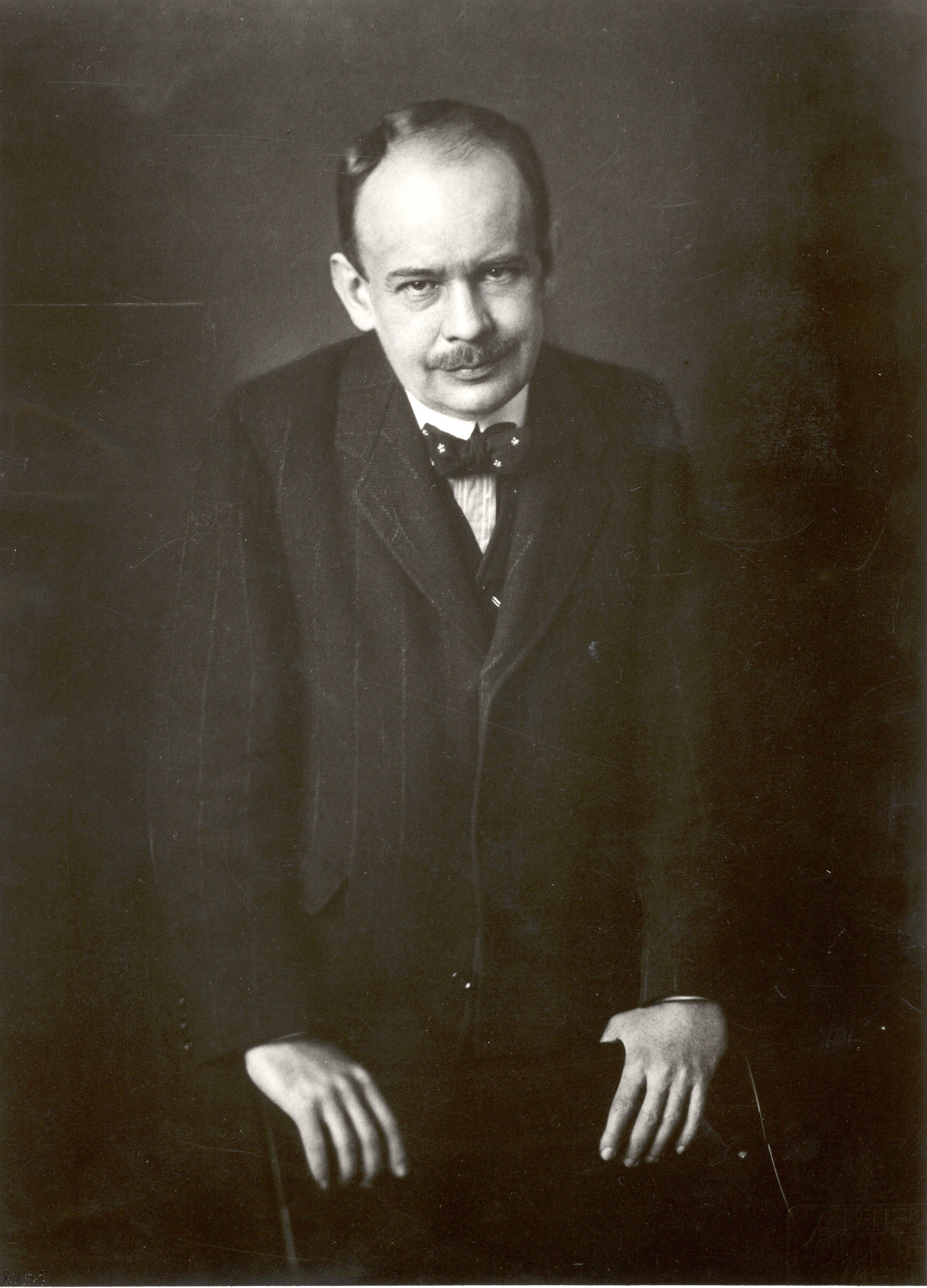
- Max Dvořák. Photo by Anton Kolm.
- Born: 4 June 1874; Roudnice nad Labem, Bohemia
- Died: 8 February 1921 (aged 46); Hrušovany nad Jevišovkou, Czechoslovakia
- Occupation: Austrian art historian

Max Dvořák (24 June 1874 – 8 February 1921) was a Czech-born Austrian art historian. He was a professor of art history at the University of Vienna and a famous member of the Vienna School of Art History, employing a Geistesgeschichte methodology.

== Early life and education ==
Dvořák was born on 24 June 1874 in Roudnice nad Labem, Bohemia, the son of a Bohemian archivist and librarian.

He studied at the universities of Prague and Vienna. In 1897, he completed a PhD thesis in history at the Institut für Österreichische Geschichtsforschung, Vienna. Having been impressed by the teaching of art historian Franz Wickhoff, he focused his attention on art history and wrote his Habilitationsschrift on Bohemian thirteenth- and fourteenth-century manuscript illumination by Johannes von Neumarkt (1901).

== Career ==
In 1902, Dvořák was appointed lecturer in art history at the University of Vienna. After Alois Riegl's death in 1905, he became, with the help of Julius von Schlosser, curator of public monuments in Austria. In 1909, he was appointed full professor of art history at the University of Vienna, which caused some problems among the nationalists of the art faculty because of Dvořák's Czech origin. Therefore, Josef Strzygowski set up his own, competing art history institute, known as the "Wiener Institut", within the same university, resulting in Dvořák and Strzygowski teaching from two different art history "centres".

He was one of the main representatives of the Vienna School of Art History, his most important publication being on the concept of art history as a history of ideas (Kunstgeschichte als Geistesgeschichte). In 1905, he succeeded Riegl as general curator of the Imperial Central Commission for the study and conservation of art and historical monuments, today Bundesdenkmalamt. He helped save many Austrian art treasures for post-World War I war reparation. He also continued the publication of the Kunstgeschichtliches Jahrbuch der Zentralkommission für die Erhaltung der Kunst- und historischen Denkmale, and in 1907, he established an inventory of Austrian and Hungarian monuments, called Österreichische Kunsttopographie. Also in 1907, he created the first complete catalogue of The Lobkowicz Collections. In 1916 he published his standard work, Katechismus der Denkmalpflege, in which he was able to raise a broad understanding for the concerns of monument protection.

== Personal life and death ==
Dvořák died from a stroke on 8 February 1921 during a visit to his friend Count Khuen von Belasi at Emmahof castle near Hrušovany nad Jevišovkou in South Moravia. He left a widow and two children. He was buried in Grusbach cemetery, in an honorary grave.

== Legacy ==
Dvořák influenced several art historians, among them Frederick Antal, Otto Benesch, Dagobert Frey, Guido Kaschnitz von Weinberg, Emil Kaufmann, Ludwig Münz, Karl Maria Swoboda, Hans Tietze and Lionello Venturi. According to Matthew Rampley, "In many respects his writing acts as a barometer of many of the tensions of the early-twentieth-century intellectual life", casting "important light on the socio-cultural situation that produced art historical discourses in the early decades of the twentieth century."

His archives are housed at the University of Vienna.

In 1921, fellow Austrian Adolf Loos designed a mausoleum for Dvořák that remained unbuilt. A scaled-down version of it by British architect Sam Jacob was erected in 2016 as a temporary installation at Highgate Cemetery, London.

== Select publications ==
- "Die Illuminatoren des Johann von Neumarkt." In Jahrbuch der Kunsthistorischen Sammlungen des Allerhöchsten Kaiserhauses, Vol. 21 (1901), pp. 35–127.
- "Das Rätsel der Kunst der Brüder van Eyck." In Jahrbuch der Kunsthistorischen Sammlungen des Allerhochsten Kaiserhauses, Vol. 24 (1904), pp. 161–317.
- Katechismus der Denkmalpflege (1916, 2nd edition, 1918).
- "Idealismus und Naturalismus in der gotischen Skulptur und Malerei." In Historische Zeitschrift, Vol. 119 (1918), pp. 1–62, 185–246.
- Oskar Kokoschka: Variationen über ein Thema. Vienna: Richard Lányi, 1921.
- Kunstgeschichte als Geistesgeschichte: Studien zur abendländischen Kunstentwicklung. Munich: R. Piper, 1924.
- Geschichte der italienischen Kunst im Zeitalter der Renaissance, 2 vols. (1927–28)
- Gesammelte Aufsätze zur Kunstgeschichte. Edited by Karl Maria Swoboda and Johannes Wilde. Munich: Piper, 1929.
- Die Gemälde Peter Bruegels des Alteren. Vienna: Schroll, 1942.
- "El Greco and Mannerism." In The Magazine of Art, Vol. 46 no. 1 (1953), pp. 14–23.
- Idealism and Naturalism in Gothic Art. Notre Dame, IN: University of Notre Dame Press, 1967.
- The History of Art as the History of Ideas. Boston: Routledge & Kegan Paul, 1984.

== See also ==
- Franz Wickhoff
- Alois Riegl
- Fritz Saxl
