= Josef Strzygowski =

Polish-Austrian art historian (1862-1941)

Strzygowski in Vienna

Josef Rudolph Thomas Strzygowski (7 March 1862 – 2 January 1941) was a Polish-Austrian art historian known for his theories promoting influences from the art of the Near East on European art, for example that of Early Christian Armenian architecture on the early Medieval architecture of Europe, outlined in his book, Die Baukunst der Armenier und Europa. He is considered a member of the Vienna School of Art History.

== Early life ==
Strzygowski was born in Biala, Kingdom of Galicia and Lodomeria (today part of Poland). His mother, Edle Trass von Friedelfeldt, was from minor nobility and his father was a cloth manufacturer. Strzygowski initially intended to pursue the same trade, beginning an apprenticeship in a weaving plant in 1880, however, in 1882 he abandoned this career and enrolled at the University of Vienna. He soon transferred to the Ludwig-Maximilians-Universität München, where he studied art history and completed a dissertation on the iconography of the Baptism of Christ, published in 1885 as Iconographie der Taufe Christi.

== Travels ==
For the next three years Strzygowski lived in Rome, where he completed a study of Cimabue und Rom (1887) (Cimabue and Rome), which emphasized the Byzantine sources of the Italian painter's work. Late in life he stated that this work led to the question which would define all of his subsequent scholarship: "What is Rome, what, in reality, is Italian and European art?"

Following his Roman sojourn, Strzygowski travelled to Thessaloniki, Mount Athos, Saint Petersburg, and Moscow, thus developing a greater acquaintance with Byzantine and Russian art. In 1892, he was appointed to the faculty of the University of Graz, but in 1894 and 1895, he lived in Cairo, where he studied the early Byzantine and Islamic art of Egypt, and compiled a catalogue of the Coptic art in the Cairo Museum. Upon his return he entered a period of intense scholarly activity, publishing numerous articles on Byzantine and Islamic art, fields in which he considered himself to be the pioneer.

== Polemics and conflict ==
It was in the midst of this activity that Strzygowski published his first polemical work, Orient oder Rom: Beiträge zur Geschichte der spätantiken und frühchristlichen Kunst (1901; 'The Orient or Rome: contributions to the history of late antique and early Christian art'). Drawing on such diverse materials as Palmyrene art and sculpture, Anatolian sarcophagi, late antique ivories from Egypt, and Coptic textiles, Strzygowski argued, in overtly racial and often racist terms, that style change in late antiquity was the product of an overwhelming "Oriental" or "Semitic" influence. In one modern characterization of both the argument and its rhetorical tone, "Strzygowski [presented] Hellas as a beautiful maiden who sold herself to an 'Old Semite' to be kept as the jewel of his harem."

Orient oder Rom was explicitly framed as an attack on Die Wiener Genesis (1895), by the Viennese art historian Franz Wickhoff, which had posited a Roman origin for the late antique style, a thesis that was pursued further by Alois Riegl in his Spätrömische Kunstindustrie, which also appeared in 1901. The ensuing controversy continued for decades and, if it resulted in no clear resolution, significantly raised the prominence of late antique art as an academic field of study.

== Later career ==
Letter (1907)

In the early 1900s, Strzygowski was invited by Wilhelm von Bode to Germany to assist with the expansion of the Byzantine and other collections in Berlin museums.

In 1909, however, upon Wickhoff's death, Strzygowski was appointed as his successor at the University of Vienna, partly as a result of the breadth of his research, and partly as a result of intricate academic politics and (possibly) the advocacy of Archduke Franz Ferdinand. His appointment resulted in an enduring schism among Viennese art historians, pitting Strzygowski against Max Dvořák and Julius von Schlosser, which was exacerbated when Strzygowski established his own research institute within the university (the Wiener Institut or Erstes kunsthistorisches Institut).

In Vienna, Strzygowski continued to publish on a variety of topics, focusing particularly on the arts of Byzantium and Islam, but also treating Armenian, Norse, and Slavic subjects, among others. He also gave frequent and well-attended public lectures to audiences "consisting partly, but not solely, of radical pan-German students and sycophants." Strzygowski's own radical pan-Germanism had already become clear in his popular Die bildende Kunst der Gegenwart (1907) ('The visual art of the future'), in which he praised the painting of Arnold Böcklin and called for a new German artist-hero to reject the heritage of classical antiquity and the Renaissance.

It would not be possible to summarise all of the theses advanced by Strzygowski in the course of his career. Brief mention may be made of his controversy with Ernst Herzfeld over the origins of the Mshatta facade, in which Herzfeld's position was eventually proven to be correct; and his two-volume Die Baukunst der Armenier und Europa (1918) ('The architecture of the Armenians and Europe'), in which he claimed to have traced the origins of Gothic architecture to Armenia.

Strzygowski retired from the University of Vienna in 1933, but in 1934 founded the Gesellschaft für vergleichende Kunstforschung ('Society for comparative art history') to serve as a platform for his theories. "In the final years, Strzygowski embraced the Nazi sentiments of racism and nationalism, although these appeared to be more the logical conclusion of his earlier theories than any attempt to court the political authorities." He died in 1941 in Vienna.

== Legacy ==
In general Strzygowski's work was characterized by a reliance on formal comparisons at the expense of historical context, and by a pervasive exaltation of the peoples of the "North" and "East", with an attendant disdain for "Mediterranean" culture.

If Strzygowski's erratic methodology have largely discredited his own scholarship, his breadth of geographical interest helped to establish Islamic art, (something which, incidentally, Ernst Gombrich denied in his conversations with Didier Eribon), and Jewish art as legitimate fields of study. Certain of his students (most notably Otto Demus, Fritz Novotny, and Ernst Diez) were successfully able to pursue these interests without subscribing to their teacher's ideology.

In recent years, there has been growing interest in Strzygowski’s research. As part of an FWF research project, a collection of Strzygowski’s offprints is being cataloged and analyzed at the University of Vienna.

== Selected works ==
- ein Neuland der Kunstgeschichte (with contributions by John Winter Crowfoot and J. I. Smirnov), Leipzig 1903
