= Franz Wickhoff =

Austrian art historian (1853-1909)

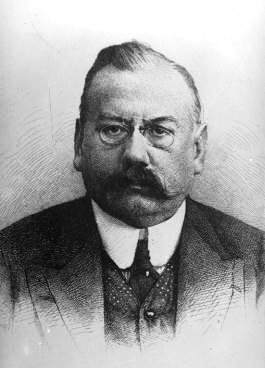
Portrait of Wickhoff.

Franz Wickhoff (7 May 1853 – 6 April 1909) was an Austrian art historian, and is considered a member of the Vienna School of Art History.

== Early life ==
Franz Wickhoff was born on 7 May 1853 in Steyr. He studied at the University of Vienna under Alexander Conze and Moritz Thausing.

== Career ==
In 1879 he received a position at the k.k. Österreichisches Museum für Kunst und Industrie (today the Museum für angewandte Kunst) in Vienna, where he met Giovanni Morelli and became interested in his theories of connoisseurship. In 1882 Wickhoff began to teach at the University of Vienna.

In 1895 Wickhoff published his major work, Die Wiener Genesis, a study of the development of Roman art from the time of Augustus to that of Constantine I. The book was significant for its appreciation of both "high imperial" Roman art, and indeed also late antique art, both of which had previously, under the overwhelming influence of Johann Joachim Winckelmann, been considered as stages of progressive decline following the achievements of Greek art. Wickhoff's study would prove to be of great importance for the later Spätrömische Kunstindustrie of Alois Riegl, his younger contemporary at the Museum, which continued the project of rehabilitating late antique art. It also sparked the extended feud between Riegl and Wickhoff, on the one side, and Josef Strzygowski, on the other, concerning the origins of the late antique style.

== Death and legacy ==
Wickhoff died in Venice on 6 April 1909. His students included many of the major figures of the next generation of Viennese art history, including Max Dvořák, Walter Friedländer, Wilhelm Koehler, Erica Tietze-Conrat, Hans Tietze and Gustav Glück. He is buried in the San Michele cemetery on the Isola di San Michele in Venice.
