= Alois Riegl =

Austrian art historian (1858-1905)

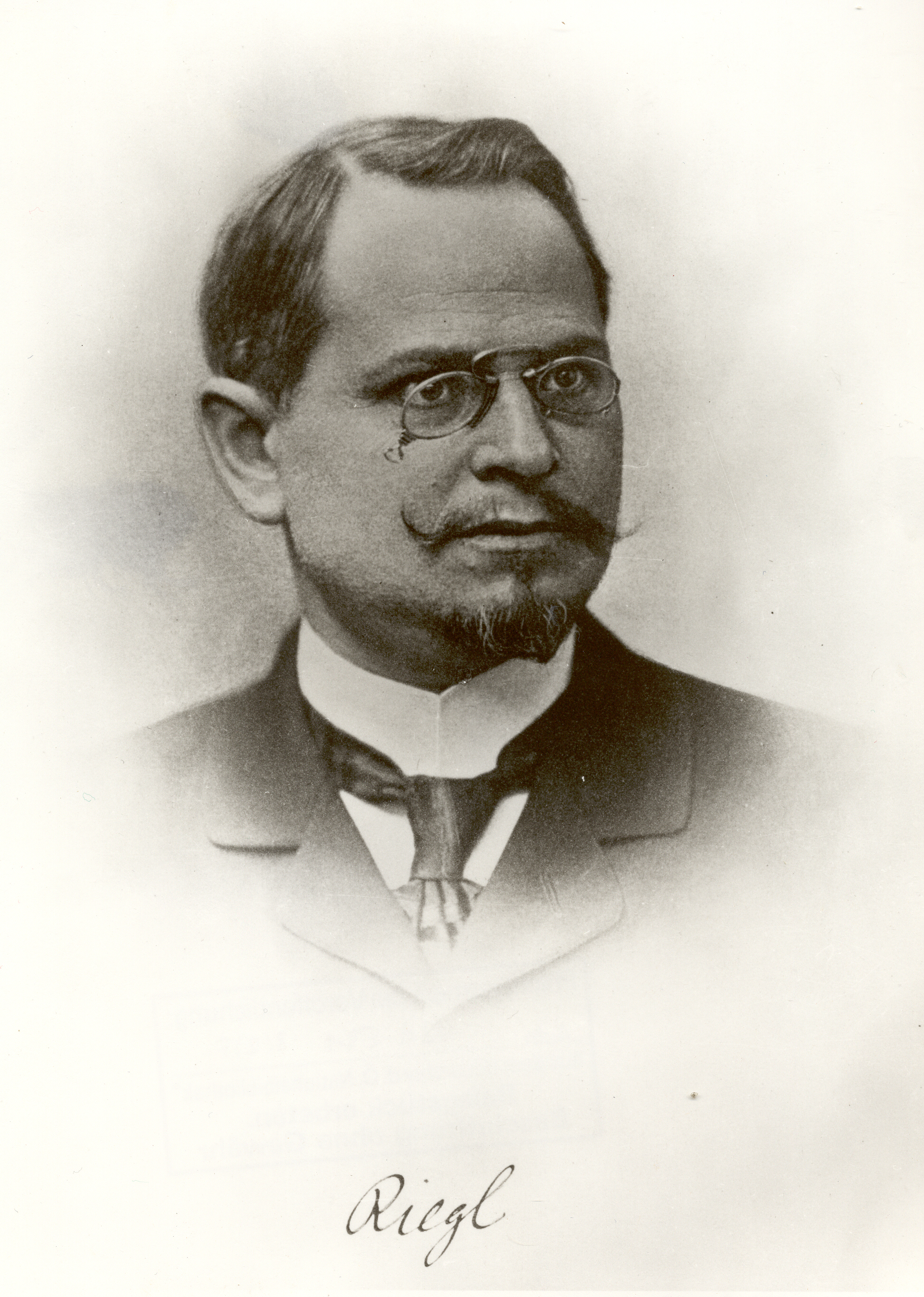
- Riegl, c. 1890
- Born: 14 January 1858; Linz
- Died: 17 June 1905 (aged 47); Vienna
- Occupation: Art historian

Academic background
- Education: University of Vienna

Alois Riegl (Austrian German: [ˈriːɡl̩]; 14 January 1858 – 17 June 1905) was an Austrian art historian, and is considered a member of the Vienna School of Art History. He was one of the major figures in the establishment of art history as a self-sufficient academic discipline, and one of the most influential practitioners of formalism.

== Life ==
Riegl studied at the University of Vienna, where he attended classes on philosophy and history taught by Franz Brentano, Alexius Meinong, Max Büdinger, and Robert Zimmerman, and studied connoisseurship on the Morellian model with Moritz Thausing. His dissertation was a study of the Jakobskirche in Regensburg, while his habilitation, completed in 1889, addressed medieval calendar manuscripts.

In 1886, Riegl accepted a curatorial position at the k.k. Österreichisches Museum für Kunst und Industrie (today the Museum für angewandte Kunst) in Vienna, where he would work for the next ten years, eventually as director of the textile department. His first book, Altorientalische Teppiche (Antique oriental carpets) (1891), grew out of this experience.

Riegl's reputation as an innovative art historian, however, was established by his second book, Stilfragen: Grundlegungen zu einer Geschichte der Ornamentik (Problems of style: foundations for a history of ornament) (1893). In this work Riegl sought to refute the materialist account of the origins of decorative motifs from, for example, the weaving of textiles, a theory that was associated with the followers of Gottfried Semper. Instead, Riegl attempted to describe a continuous and autonomous "history of ornament". To this end he followed certain ornamental motifs, such as the arabesque, from ancient near eastern through classical and up into early medieval and Islamic art, in the process developing the idea of a Kunstwollen (often translated as "will to art"). Riegl seems to have conceived the Kunstwollen as a historically contingent tendency of an age or a nation that drove stylistic development without respect to mimetic or technological concerns. Its proper interpretation, however, has itself been a subject of scholarly debate for over a century.

In 1894, on the basis of the Stilfragen, Riegl was awarded an extraordinarius position at the University of Vienna, where he began to lecture on Baroque art, a period that was at the time considered merely as the decadent end of the Renaissance. In the meantime he became increasingly preoccupied with the relationship between stylistic development and cultural history, a concern that may indicate the growing influence of Karl Schnaase's work on his thought. This concern is particularly evident in two manuscripts that he prepared during this time, but were published only after his death as the Historische Grammatik der bildenden Künste (Historical grammar of the visual arts). In these manuscripts Riegl attempted to chart the entire history of western art as the record of a "contest with nature." This contest took different forms depending on the changing historical conceptions of nature by humans.

In 1901, Riegl published a work that combined his interest in neglected, "transitional," periods with his endeavor to explain the relationship between style and cultural history. This took the form of a study of late antiquity. The Spätrömische Kunstindustrie (Late Roman art industry) (1901) was an attempt to characterize late antique art through stylistic analyses of its major monuments (for example, the Arch of Constantine) and also of such humble objects as belt buckles. The Kunstindustrie followed the lead of an earlier work by Riegl's colleague Franz Wickhoff, Die Wiener Genesis (1895), a study of late antique manuscript painting. The two books, taken together, were among the first to consider the aesthetic characteristics of late antique art on their own terms, and not as representing the collapse of classical standards. They also led to a controversy between Riegl and Wickhoff, on the one side, and Josef Strzygowski, on the other, concerning the origins of the late antique style.

It has been argued, however, that the Kunstindustrie was conceived more as a philosophical justification of the concept of Kunstwollen than as a study of late antique art. Indeed, one of Riegl's clearer definitions of the concept appears in the final chapter of the Kunstindustrie:

All human will is directed toward a satisfactory shaping of man's relationship to the world, within and beyond the individual. The plastic Kunstwollen regulates man's relationship to the sensibly perceptible appearance of things. Art expresses the way man wants to see things shaped or colored, just as the poetic Kunstwollen expresses the way man wants to imagine them. Man is not only a passive, sensory recipient, but also a desiring, active being who wishes to interpret the world in such a way (varying from one people, region, or epoch to another) that it most clearly and obligingly meets his desires. The character of this will is contained in what we call the worldview (again in the broadest sense): in religion, philosophy, science, even statecraft and law.

Here all the main elements of Riegl's mature conception of the Kunstwollen are clearly expressed: its active nature, through which art becomes, not the imitation of reality, but the expression of a desired reality; its historical contingency; and its relation to other elements of "worldview." By means of this theoretical apparatus, Riegl could claim to penetrate to the essence of a culture or an era through formal analysis of the art that it produced.

Riegl's final completed monograph, Das holländische Gruppenporträt (The Group Portraiture of Holland, 1902), focused on the Dutch baroque, and represented yet another shift in method. Here Riegl began to develop a theory of "attentiveness" to describe the relationship between the viewer of a work of art and the work itself. He argued that Dutch group portraiture transformed the viewer from a passive observer into an active participant by organizing paintings through networks of perceived attentiveness rather than hierarchical action.

Riegl died from cancer three years later, at the age of 47.

== Legacy ==
Many of Riegl's unfinished works were published after his death, including Die Entstehung der Barockkunst in Rom (published in a translation in 2010 as The Origins of Baroque Art in Rome) and the Historische Grammatik der bildenden Künste (Historical grammar of the visual arts). Riegl had a robust following in Vienna, and certain of his students (the so-called Second Vienna School) attempted to develop his theories into a comprehensive art-historical method. In certain cases, such as that of the controversial Hans Sedlmayr, this led to unrestrained formalism. As a result, Riegl's stock declined, particularly in the American academy, and iconography was seen as a more responsible method.

Riegl's Stilfragen remained influential throughout the twentieth century. Its terminology was introduced to English-language scholarship in particular by Paul Jacobsthal's work on Celtic art. Ernst Gombrich drew heavily on the Stilfragen, which he called "the one great book ever written about the history of ornament", in his own study of The sense of order.

At the turn of the twentieth century, Riegl had a significant impact on Otto Rank's seminal work, Art and Artist. Rank recognized the will-to-art as parallel to an idea he had been developing on creative urge and personality development. Riegl's work allowed Rank to apply the general problem of will to artistic expression across cultures where Rank found consistency for the individual will in a social ideology. Primitive, "ornamental" art, for example, uniquely represents a social belief in the abstract soul, and does not represent a lack of naturalism; it is an accurate presentation of the abstract in concrete form. Rank follows the development of art, which he believes contributes more than religion, in the humanization and concretization of the soul belief as classically displayed in nature and then man himself as the god. It is Riegl's emphasis on the historical context that initially inspires Rank to equally consider all forms of expression as a will-to-art.

Wilhelm Worringer likewise mentions his debt to Riegl in terms of art theory, and what Worringer calls, "the urge to abstraction." Art history is not a progress of ability from primitive lack of skill, but is, in Riegl's terms, a history of volition. Clemena Antonova writes, "Worringer sides with Riegl in that relativist approach to art and maintains that, "what appears from our standpoint the greatest distortion, must have been, at the time, for its creator the highest beauty and expression of his artistic volition." Rank cites Worringer as taking Riegl up to the verge of psychological insight where art forms can be interpreted parallel to forms of belief in the soul, and, indeed, Worringer coined the term "expressionism" which is the modern individual psychology of Rank's presentation under primitive abstraction, classical intuition, and modern expression.

In the late twentieth century, the entirety of Riegl's work was revisited by scholars of diverse methodological persuasions, including post-structuralism and reception aesthetics. In retrospect a number of tendencies of Riegl's work seem to have foreshadowed the concerns of contemporary art history: his insistence that aesthetics be treated in historical context, and not in relation to an ideal standard; his interest in the "minor" arts; and his attention to the relationship between viewers and objects.

== Works ==
The most complete bibliographies of Riegl's work are found in K.M. Swoboda, ed., Gesammelte Aufsätze (Augsburg, 1929), xxxv-xxxix; Collected Essays (Riverside, 2023), 43-66; and E.M. Kain and D. Britt, tr., The Group Portraiture of Holland (Los Angeles, 1989), 384-92. The following list includes only monographs, book-length works, and collections, arranged by date of publication.

- Die ägyptischen Textilfunde im Österr. Museum (Vienna, 1889).
- Altorientalische Teppiche (Leipzig, 1891).
- Stilfragen (Berlin, 1893). Translated by E. Kain, Problems of Style (Princeton, 1992).
- Volkskunst, Hausfleiß, und Hausindustrie (Berlin, 1894).
- Ein orientalischer Teppich vom Jahre 1202 (Berlin, 1895).
- Die spätrömische Kunstindustrie nach den Funden in Österreich-Ungarn (Vienna, 1901). Translated by R. Winkes, Late Roman Art Industry (Rome, 1985).
- "Das holländische Gruppenporträt," Jahrbuch des allerhöchsten Kaiserhauses 22 (1902), 71-278. Translated by E.M. Kain and D. Britt, The Group Portraiture of Holland (Los Angeles, 1999, fully available online)
- Der moderne Denkmalkultus, sein Wesen, seine Entstehung (Vienna, 1903). Translated by K. W. Forster and D. Ghirardo, “The Modern Cult of Monuments: Its Character and Origin,” Oppositions 25 (1982), 20-51.
- Die Entstehung der Barockkunst in Rom: Vorlesungen aus 1901–1902, ed. A. Burda and M. Dvořák (Vienna, 1908; translated and edited by Andrew Hopkins and Arnold Witte, The Origins of Baroque Art in Rome, Los Angeles: Getty, 2010).
- Gesammelte Aufsätze, ed. K.M. Swoboda (Augsburg, 1929). Tr. Karl Johns, Collected Essays (Riverside, California: Ariadne Press, 2023).
- Historische Grammatik der bildenden Künste, ed. K.M. Swoboda and O. Pächt (Graz, 1966). Translated by J.E. Jung, Historical Grammar of the Visual arts (New York, 2004).

== Sources ==
=== Monographs ===
- M. Gubser, Time's Visible Surface: Alois Riegl and the Discourse on History and Temporality in Fin-de-siècle Vienna (Detroit, 2006).
- M. Iversen, Alois Riegl: Art history and Theory (Cambridge, 1993).
- M. Olin, Forms of Representation in Alois Riegl's Theory of Art (University Park, PA, 1992).
- P. Noever, A. Rosenauer and G. Vasold (eds): Alois Riegl Revisited: Beiträge zu Werk und Rezeption – Contributions to the Opus and its Reception. (Wien, 2010).
- M. Podro, The Critical Historians of Art (New Haven, 1984).
- M. Rampley, The Vienna School of Art History. Empire and the Politics of Scholarship, 1847–1918 (University Park, 2013)
- A. Reichenberger, Riegls “Kunstwollen”: Versuch einer Neubetrachtung (Sankt Augustin, 2003)
- D. Cordileone, Alois Riegl in Vienna 1875–1905: An Institutional Biography. (Farnham: Ashgate, 2014) ISBN 978-1-4094-6665-9
- S. Scarrocchia, Oltre la storia dell’arte: Alois Riegl, vita e opere di un protagonisto della cultura viennese (Milan, 2006).
- G. Vasold, Alois Riegl und die Kunstgeschichte als Kulturgeschichte: Überlegungen zum Frühwerk des Wiener Gelehrten (Freiburg, 2004).
- C. S. Wood (ed.), The Vienna School Reader: Politics and Art Historical Method in the 1930s (New York, 2000).
- Richard Woodfield (ed.): Framing Formalism: Riegl's Work (Amsterdam, 2001).

=== Articles ===
- B. Binstock, “Postscript: Alois Riegl in the Presence of ‘The Nightwatch’,” October 74 (1995), 36-44.
- R. Casetti, "Vom Nutzen und Nachteil der Historie im modernen Denkmalkultus. Der Einfluss von Friedrich Nietzsche auf Alois Riegl.", Österreichische Zeitschrift für Kunst und Denkmalpflege, Heft 1 LXII 2008.
- P. Crowther, “More than Ornament: The Significance of Riegl,” Art History 17 (1994), 482–94.
- G. Dolff-Bonekämper, "Gegenwartswerte. Für eine Erneuerung von Alois Riegls Denkmalwerttheorie". In: Hans-Rudolf Meier und Ingrid Scheurmann (eds.). DENKmalWERTE. Beiträge zur Theorie und Aktualität der Denkmalpflege. Georg Mörsch zum 70. Geburtstag. Deutscher Kunstverlag, Berlin, Munich 2010, ISBN 978-3-422-06903-9, 27–40.
- J. Elsner, “The Birth of Late Antiquity: Riegl and Strzygowski in 1901,” Art History 25 (2002), 358–79.
- J. Elsner, “From Empirical Evidence to the Big Picture: Some Reflections on Riegl's Concept of Kunstwollen,” Critical Inquiry 32 (2006), 741–66.
- Michael Falser, "Denkmalpflege zwischen europäischem Gedächtnis und nationaler Erinnerung – Riegls Alterswert und Kulturtechniken der Berliner Nachwendezeit." In: Csàky, M., Großegger, E. (eds) Jenseits von Grenzen. Transnationales, translokales Gedächtnis. Vienna 2007, 75–93.
- Michael Falser, "Zum 100. Todesjahr von Alois Riegl. Der Alterswert als Beitrag zur Konstruktion staatsnationaler Identität in der Habsburg-Monarchie um 1900 und seine Relevanz heute. In: Österreichische Zeitschrift für Kunst- und Denkmalpflege, Wien. (LIX, 2005) Heft 3/4, 298–311.
- M. Ghilardi, Alle origini del dibattito sulla nascita dell’arte tardoantica. Riflessi nella critica italiana, in MEDITERRANEO ANTICO V, 1, 2002, pp. 117–146. https://www.academia.edu/2282537/Alle_origini_del_dibattito_sulla_nascita_dellarte_tardoantica._Riflessi_nella_critica_italiana
- M. Ghilardi - F. Zevi, Echi di Riegl nella critica italiana, in Alois Riegl (1858–1905) un secolo dopo, Atti del Convegno Internazionale di Studi, Roma 30 Novembre / 1-2 Dicembre 2005, Accademia Nazionale dei Lincei, Atti dei Convegni Lincei 236, Roma 2008, pp. 219–237. https://www.academia.edu/2307464/Echi_di_Riegl_nella_critica_italiana.
- W. Kemp, “Alois Riegl,” in H. Dilly, ed., Altmeister der Kunstgeschichte (Berlin, 1990), 37–60.
- M. Olin, “Alois Riegl: The late Roman Empire in the late Habsburg Empire,” Austrian Studies 5 (1994), 107–20.
- O. Pächt, “Alois Riegl,” Burlington Magazine 105 (1963), 190–91.
- E. Panofsky, “Der Begriff des Kunstwollens,” Zeitschrift für Ästhetik und allgemeine Kunstwissenschaft 14 (1920). Reprinted in H. Oberer and E. Verheyen, eds., Aufsätze zu Grundfragen der Kunstwissenschaft (Berlin, 1974). Tr. K.J. Northcott and J. Snyder, “The Concept of Artistic Volition,” Critical Inquiry 8 (1981), 17–33.
- M. Rampley, “Spectatorship and the Historicity of art: Re-reading Alois Riegl's Historical Grammar of the Fine Arts,” Word and Image 12 (1996), 209–17.
- M. Rampley, "Subjectivity and modernism. Riegl and the rediscovery of the Baroque," in Richard Woodfield, ed., Framing Formalism. Riegl's Work (Amsterdam, 2000) 265-90.
- M. Rampley, "Art history and the Politics of Empire. Re-thinking the Vienna School," Art Bulletin 91.4 (2009), 447–63.
- W. Sauerländer, “Alois Riegl und die Enstehung der autonomen Kunstgeschichte am Fin-de-Siècle,” in R. Bauer et al., eds., Fin-de-Siècle: zu Literatur und Kunst der Jahrhundertwende (Frankfurt, 1977), 125–39.
- F. Tononi - T. Murár, “New Studies on Alois Riegl and the Vienna School of Art History”, The Edgar Wind Journal, Vol. 9 (2025), pp. 1–4.
- Céline Trautmann-Waller, "Alois Riegl (1858–1905)". In: Michel Espagne and Bénédicte Savoy (eds.). Dictionnaire des historiens d'art allemands. CNRS Editions, Paris 2010, ISBN 978-2-271-06714-2, pp. 217–228; 405.
- H. Zerner, “Alois Riegl: Art, Value, and Historicism,” Daedalus 105 (1976), pp. 177–88.
