= International Research Institute for Cultural Technologies and Media Philosophy =

Former research center of Bauhaus-Universität Weimar

The International Research Institute for Cultural Techniques and Media Philosophy (IKKM) was a center for advanced studies at the Bauhaus-Universität Weimar, and was founded in 2008 by Lorenz Engell and Bernhard Siegert. The IKKM was part of the International Käte Hamburger Collegia for research in the Humanities initiative in the 'Freedom for Research in the Humanities' program of the German Federal Ministry of Education and Research (BMBF). Initial funding has been approved for six years (until 2014). Until March 2020 the IKKM was located in the Palais Dürckheim build by Henry van de Velde.

== Research ==
The institute was a research establishment based on the fellow principle. Fellow appointment was supervised by an international advisory board consisting of professors Raymond Bellour, Hans Belting, Régis Debray, Hans Ulrich Gumbrecht, and Sigrid Weigel. Each year the IKKM invited up to ten internationally renowned scholars for one or two semesters to Weimar, enabling them to pursue a research project and contribute to the development of questions regarding media-philosophy and research in cultural technologies. The first funding period of the IKKM consist of six annual research topics:

- 2008/09: Hominization and Anthropotechnologies – the Making of Humans
- 2009/10: Referencialization and Ontogenesis – the Making of Things
- 2010/11: Semiosis—the Transformation of Objects into Signs
- 2011/12: Localization—the Production of Sites
- 2012/13: Synchronization—the Production of the Present
- 2013/14: Historization—the Production of the Past

== People ==
=== Members ===
Directors: Lorenz Engell, Bernhard Siegert

=== Advisory board ===
Jacques Aumon, Raymond Bellour, Hans Belting, Régis Debray, John Durham Peters, Hans Ulrich Gumbrecht

=== Fellows ===
Summer term 2011

Mario Carpo, Søren Frank, Linda Dalrymple Henderson, Brian Larkin, Catherine Bertho Lavenir, Anna McCarthy, Wolfgang Pircher, Joseph Vogl, Samuel Weber

Winter term 2010/2011

Eric Alliez, Dominique Blüher, Bruce Clarke, Michael Diers, Thomas Hauschild, Erich Hörl, Gertrud Koch, Bettine Menke, Irit Rogoff, Martin Schulz, Herta Wolf

Summer term 2010

Eric Alliez, Christoph Asendorf, Hartmut Böhme, Linda Dalrymple Henderson, Tom Gunning, Erich Hörl, Jürgen Müller, Patricia Pisters, Hans-Jörg Rheinberger, David N. Rodowick, Nikolaus Wegmann

Winter term 2009/2010

Christoph Asendorf, Jacques Aumont, Jiří Bystřický, Hartmut Böhme, Peter Geimer, Eva Geulen, Joachim Krausse, Dieter Mersch, Jürgen Müller, Patricia Pisters, Manfred Schneider

Summer term 2009

Wolfgang Beilenhoff, Georges Didi-Huberman, Richard Dyer, Josef Früchtl, Frank Kessler, Joachim Krausse, Almira Ousmanova, Manfred Schneider

Winter term 2008/2009

Wolfgang Beilenhoff, Marta Braun, Georges Didi-Huberman, Thomas Macho, Claus Pias, Erhard Schüttpelz, Ludger Schwarte

Summer term 2008

Wolfgang Beilenhoff, Thomas Macho
