= View from Williamsburg, Brooklyn, on Manhattan, 9/11 =

Photograph by Thomas Hoepker

Coordinates: 40°42′39″N 73°58′11″W

Thomas Hoepker: View from Williamsburg, Brooklyn, on Manhattan, 9/11 (2001)

View from Williamsburg, Brooklyn, on Manhattan, 9/11 is a color photograph by German photographer Thomas Hoepker. It shows five people sitting on the banks of the East River in the Williamsburg neighborhood of the New York City Borough of Brooklyn while a cloud of smoke rises over Manhattan in the background. It emanates from the collapsed towers of the World Trade Center, which had been the target of a terrorist attack that day.

Hoepker initially refrained from publishing the photograph because the pictured people seemed too unaffected by the events. The photo was presented to the public for the first time in 2005 at the Munich City Museum in an exhibition of Hoepker's work. In September 2006, an article in the New York Times triggered a controversy about the interpretation of the photograph in the United States, in which two of the depicted people also spoke out and stated that they had talked about the attacks while the image was taken. Subsequently, art historians and media studies scholars also addressed the photograph.

== Creation ==
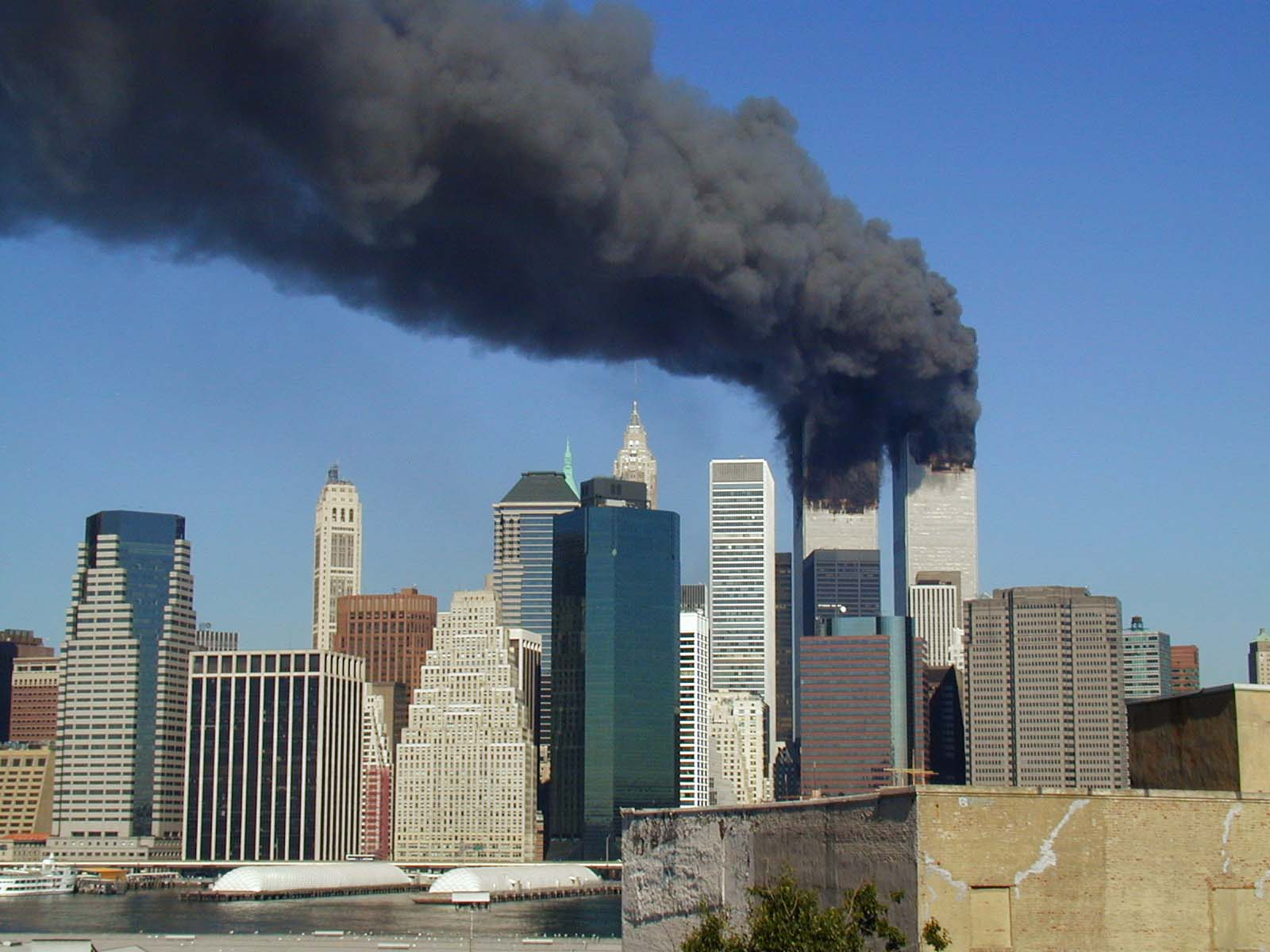
The Twin Towers of the World Trade Center after the impact of the two airplanes

On the morning of September 11, 2001, flights AA11 and UA175 left Logan International Airport in Boston with destination Los Angeles International Airport. Both planes were hijacked by members of the Islamist al-Qaeda terrorist network, and were flown into the Twin Towers of the World Trade Center in New York City at 8:46 and 9:03 a.m., respectively. Thomas Hoepker, a German photographer living in New York, was informed of the first attack by a colleague and shortly thereafter left his apartment on the Upper East Side to go to the scene of the attack. Since the subway was no longer running, he tried to go there by car. Because of heavy traffic and road closures, he used a detour through Queens and Brooklyn. On the way, he arrived at an Italian restaurant on the East River near the Williamsburg Bridge, on whose garden terrace the View from Williamsburg and two other shots of the same subject were taken. He took the photos with his Canon EOS camera and Fujichrome slide film. By this time, both towers had collapsed. He then continued toward the Manhattan Bridge to get to the disaster site. As a result of the road closure, he could only walk onto the bridge. Here he took more photos.

== Description ==
In the foreground of the photo, a group of five people sits on the bank of the East River, bathed in bright sunlight. Two women are in front on the left, one is sitting on a chair, and the other is squatting on the ground. In the center, a man sits on a bench with a red bicycle in front of him. Next to him, a woman and a man are sitting on a wooden parapet. The man on the parapet has obviously gotten the word, the others turn to him attentively. The poses of the five people seem relaxed. The posture of the woman on the parapet seems especially casual and gives the impression that she is sunbathing. The group is framed by two dark green conifers or cypresses. The center of the background shows the overlapping silhouettes of the Manhattan Bridge and the Brooklyn Bridge. A large cloud of smoke emanates from the southern tip of Manhattan. Together with a series of pilings and planks in the water, it forms a triangle that appears to point to the source of the smoke. None of the people depicted look at the smoke.

== Publication and reactions ==
In the days following the attacks, Hoepker met with colleagues from his agency Magnum Photos to review their photographs of the events and to discuss how to deal with them. They decided to produce a photobook, and Hoepker was appointed editor in charge. The book was published in the same year. Hoepker contributed three photographs he had taken from the Manhattan Bridge. The View from Williamsburg was missing from the book. In a later statements, Hoepker said the reason for this self-censorship was that the photograph "didn't live up to the drama of the other shots", seemed "too pretty", and thus might "distort the reality as we had felt it on that historic day".

The photograph was displayed publicly for the first time in 2005, as part of an exhibition of Thomas Hoepker's 50 years of work presented at the Munich City Museum between November 25 and May 28, 2006. The retrospective was also shown at the Museum für Kunst und Gewerbe Hamburg and the C/O Berlin in 2006 and 2007. In the accompanying exhibition catalog, the View from Williamsburg occupies a special position: it is both shown on the cover and it is the first photograph in the book. In the extensive German press coverage of the exhibition, the photo also clearly stood out from the total of about 200 images shown. In particular, the apparent unconcern of the five pictured people became the target of media commentary. For example, for Freddy Langer of the Frankfurter Allgemeine Zeitung Hoepker's photograph raised the question of "how dramatically a photograph must be constructed today if some viewer is unmoved even by the gruesome reality." A similar opinion was expressed by Matthias Reichelt in Die Tageszeitung, for whom the picture "offers reason to reflect on distance and closeness, blunting and empathy for violence and catastrophes in the 21st century."

In 2006, U.S. media also dealt with the photo. That year it appeared in the book Watching the World Change by David Friend, which illuminates the stories behind the images of 9/11. In the book, Hoepker expressed the view that the people in the photo had not been moved by the events. This was picked up by Frank Rich in a guest editorial for the New York Times on the occasion of the fifth anniversary of the attacks. He complained about his compatriots not having learned from the attacks and of, as usual in the U.S., moving on from it too quickly. In this context, he refers to Hoepker's photo, which he sees as anticipating this development. From his point of view, the people appear to be chatting and enjoying the sun. In doing this, he says, they are not necessarily callous but just American. Shortly thereafter, David Plotz contradicted Rich's views on the photograph in an article in the online magazine Slate. To him, the people in the photo appeared to be discussing the attacks. At the end of the article, he asked the persons pictured to contact the editor to express their views. Walter Sipser and Chris Schiavo were able to prove with recent images that they were the people sitting on the parapet to the right. The two, who had been a couple at the time the photo was taken, clarified that they had been shocked by the attacks and had talked about the event with the other people whom they did not know. Hoepker would have been able to determine this if he had come up to them that day and asked permission to take a photo. Hoepker later commented that he had deliberately not approached the people in the picture: "As a photojournalist, I do everything I can not to influence the events I am witnessing. If you were to start a conversation or ask permission, you would change any authentic situation in an instant."

== Analysis ==
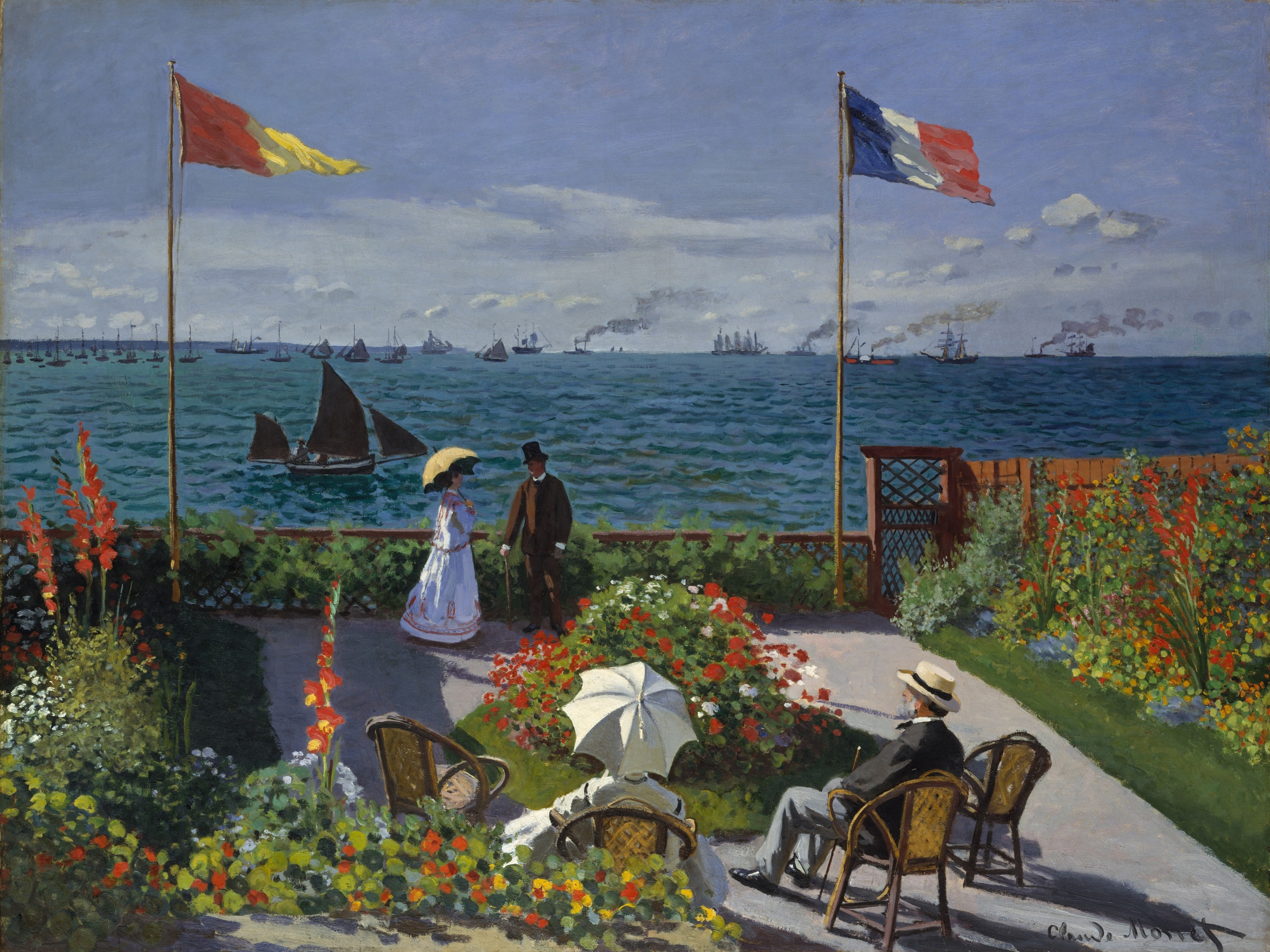
Garden at Sainte-Adresse

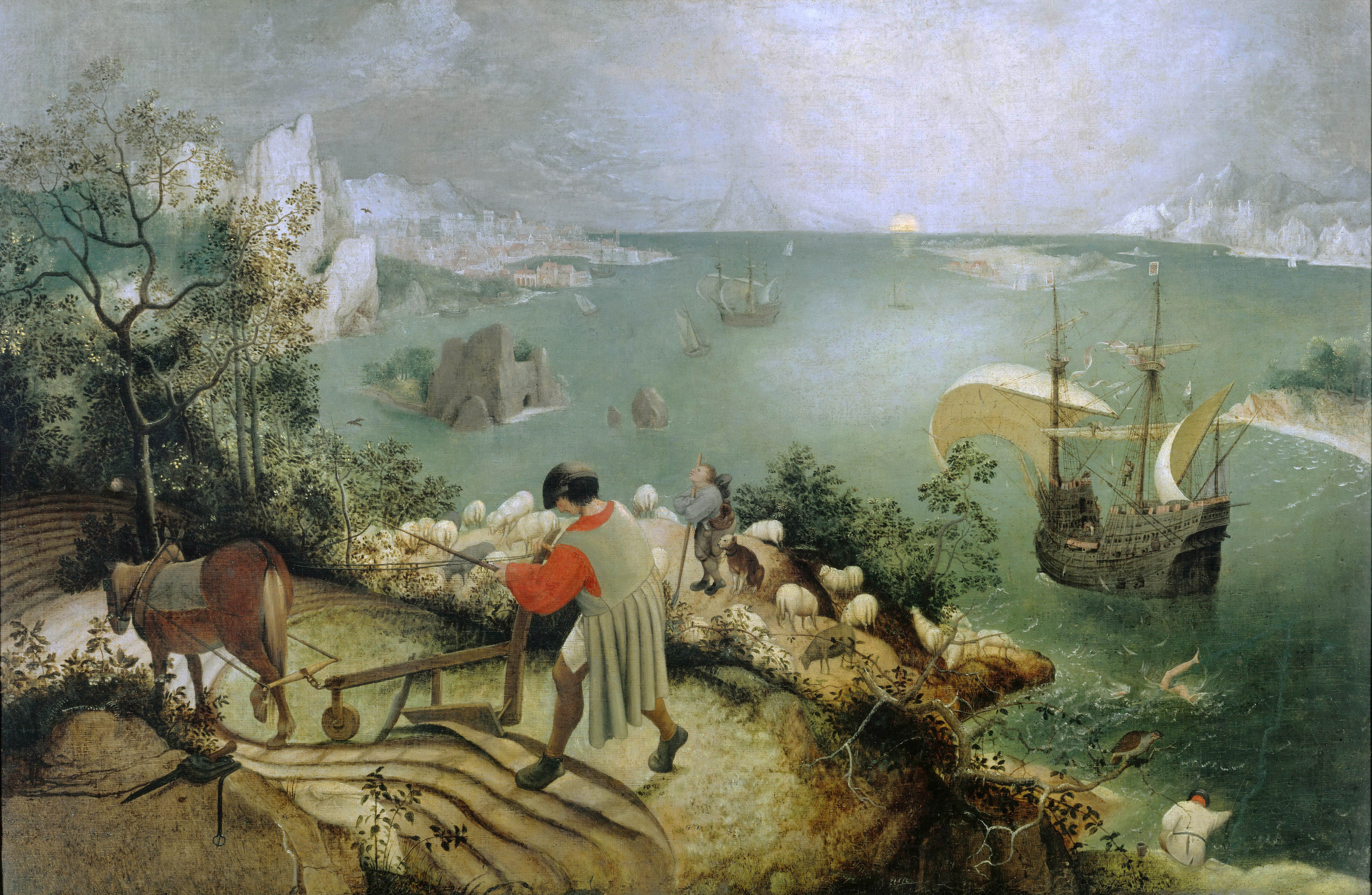
Landscape with the Fall of Icarus

The art historian Michael Diers assigns the View from Williamsburg to the genre of conversation pieces, which was popular especially in 18th-century England as a form of family and social portrait and later was supplanted by photography. The focus of the paintings was often on a group of people in conversation in a landscape, as is the case with Hoepker's photograph. In addition, the photograph resembles standard motifs of impressionist plein air painting in its subject and structure. As an example, Diers cites the painting Garden at Sainte-Adresse by the French painter Claude Monet. It shows two couples sitting in the foreground on a sunlit terrace separated from the sea by a fence. The background shows plumes of smoke from passing steamboats. As Diers says, Monet's painting radiates balance and tranquility through its construction, while Hoepker's photograph emanates a certain restlessness through the slight slant of the parapet. To Diers, the resulting irritation is supported by the large column of smoke.

Hoepker himself also compared his photograph to a painting. In an interview published in the book Watching the World Change before the debate in the U.S. media, he sees similarities with the painting Landscape with the Fall of Icarus, attributed to the Flemish painter Pieter Bruegel the Elder. To him this painting shows an idyllic landscape with something terrible happening in the background, just like his photograph. Part of the painting are a farmer, a shepherd and a fishermen. The three do not pay attention to the fall of Icarus into the sea, which can be seen on the lower right, just as the people in the photo gave Hoepker the impression of not being interested in the catastrophe in the background.

== Bibliography ==
- Diers, Michael (2016). Vor aller Augen. Studien zu Kunst, Bild und Politik (in German). Paderborn: Wilhelm Fink. pp. 123–139. ISBN 978-3-77-05-6059-2.
- Fleming, Dan (2011). "The Talk of the Town: 9/11, the Lost Image, and the Machiavellian Moment". Global Media Journal – Canadian Edition. 4 (2): 63–77. S2CID 190275304.
- Peeters, Wim (2009). "9/11 und das Insistieren des Alltags. Pressefotografie und deutsche Gegenwartsliteratur" (PDF). In Poppe, Sandra; Schüller, Thorsten; Seiler, Sascha (eds.). 9/11 als kulturelle Zäsur. Repräsentationen des 11. Septembers 2001 in kulturellen Diskursen, Literatur und visuellen Medien (in German). Bielefeld: Transcript. pp. 157–165. ISBN 978-3-8376-1016-1.
