= Claus Pias =

German art historian and philosopher (born 1967)

Claus Pias (born 1967 in Cologne, West Germany) is a German media theorist and media historian. He is a professor for history and epistemology of media at the Institute for Culture and Aesthetics of Digital Media (ICAM) at Leuphana University in Lueneburg, Germany.

== Life and work ==
Pias studied Electrical Engineering in Aachen, Germany and Art History, German Studies and Philosophy in Bonn and Bochum, Germany. In 1993 he became Research Assistant for History of Architecture at the Bauhaus-University Weimar, Germany. Three years later, he moved to the Chair of Joseph Vogl for "History and Theory of Artificial Worlds". In 2000 he earned his doctorate in Weimar under the supervision of Joseph Vogl and German media theorist Friedrich Kittler. In 2002 he was appointed Junior Professor for "Media Technology and Media Philosophy" at the Ruhr-University Bochum. From 2006 to 2010 he was full Professor for "Epistemology and Philosophy of Digital Media" at the University of Vienna, Austria.

Since the winter semester of 2010 he has worked and taught in Lueneburg. In the same year, he co-founded the Institute for Culture and Aesthetics of Digital Media (ICAM) at the Faculty of Culture. In 2012, he was also co-founder of the Center for Digital Cultures (CDC) and is a member of the board of directors of the research center. He is also currently director of the Institute for Advanced Study in Media Cultures of Computer Simulation (mecs) and the Digital Cultures Research Lab (DCRL), all at Leuphana University, Lueneburg. Since 2010 Pias was a Senior Fellow at the International Research Institute for Cultural Technologies and Media Philosophy (IKKM) in Weimar, the International Research Centre for Cultural Studies (IFK) in Vienna, the Institute for Advanced Study / Wissenschaftskolleg Berlin, the Center of Excellence “Cultural Foundations of Integration” at the University of Konstanz, and the Center for Advanced Studies "BildEvidenz. History and Aesthetics" at Free University, Berlin. In 2017 he was visiting professor at Princeton University. He is also a member of the Graduate Schools "Loose Connections: Collectivity at the intersection of digital and urban space" in Hamburg and "Cultures of Critique" in Lueneburg.

His main areas of interest are media theory, history of science of ‚mediathinking‘ and the history and epistemology of simulation and cybernetics.

He published the collected protocols and documents of the Macy Conferences (1946–1953) in two volumes in 2003/2004. In addition to his publishing activity he supervised the publication of the critical writings in individual editions by Hermann Bahr from 2004 to 2013. Together with Joseph Vogl, he publishes "sequenzia", a series of media science and science history at the Diaphanes publishing house Zurich/Berlin

== Bibliography ==
=== In English ===
2017: Computer Game Worlds, Chicago: Chicago UP, translated by Valentin Pakis, ISBN 978-3-0358-0013-5
2016: Cybernetics. The Macy Conferences 1946–1953. The Complete Transactions, (ed.), Chicago: Chicago UP
2016: Social Media – New Masses, with Inge Baxmann and Timon Beyes (ed.), translated by Valentin Pakis, Chicago: Chicago UP, ISBN 978-3-03734-642-6

=== In German ===
1996: Geschaute Literatur. Marie von Ebner-Eschenbach und die bildende Kunst, Weimar: VDG
1999: Dreizehn Vorträge zur Medienkultur, (ed.), Weimar: VDG
1999: Kursbuch Medienkultur, with Joseph Vogl, Lorenz Engell, Oliver Fahle & Britta Neitzel (ed.), Stuttgart: DVA
2000: Neue Vorträge zur Medienkultur, (ed.), Weimar: VDG
2002: Computer Spiel Welten, Zürich/Berlin: diaphanes, ISBN 978-3-935300-47-6 (2. edition. 2010)
2003: Cybernetics | Kybernetik. The Macy-Conferences 1946–1953. Band 1. Transactions/Protokolle, (ed.) Zürich/Berlin: diaphanes
2005: Zukünfte des Computers, (ed.), Zürich/Berlin: diaphanes
2004: Cybernetics | Kybernetik. The Macy-Conferences 1946–1953. Band 2. Documents/Dokumente, (ed.) Zürich/Berlin: diaphanes
2004-2013: Hermann Bahr: Kritische Schriften in Einzelausgaben, (ed.)
2007: Escape. Computerspiele als Kulturtechnik, with Christian Holtorf (ed.), Köln/Wien: Böhlau
2008: Abwehr. Modelle Strategien Medien, (ed.), Bielefeld: transcript 2008
2009: Powerpoint: Macht und Einfluss eines Präsentationsprogramms, with Wolfgang Coy (ed.), Frankfurt/Main: Fischer
2010: Was waren Medien?, (ed.) Zürich/Berlin: diaphanes, ISBN 978-3-03734-127-8
2010: Think Tanks. Die Beratung der Gesellschaft, with Sebastian Vehlken (ed.), Zürich/Berlin: diaphanes
2014: Soziale Medien: Neue Massen. Medienwissenschaftliche Symposien der DFG, with Inge Baxmann and Timon Beyes (ed.), Zürich/Berlin: diaphanes, ISBN 978-3-03734-748-5
2016: Vollstes Verständnis. Utopien der Kommunikation, with Stefan Rieger (ed.), Berlin: diaphanes, ISBN 978-3-03734-631-0
