= History of probability =

Probability has a dual aspect: on the one hand the likelihood of hypotheses given the evidence for them, and on the other hand the behavior of stochastic processes such as the throwing of dice or coins. The study of the former is historically older in, for example, the law of evidence, while the mathematical treatment of dice began with the work of Cardano, Pascal, Fermat and Christiaan Huygens between the 16th and 17th century.

Probability deals with random experiments with a known distribution, Statistics deals with inference from the data about the unknown distribution.

== Etymology ==
Probable and probability, along with their cognates in other modern languages, derive from medieval learned Latin probabilis. This term, first used by Cicero, was generally applied to opinions to mean plausible or generally approved. The form probability is derived from the Old French probabilite (14 c.) and directly from the Latin probabilitatem (nominative probabilitas) "credibility, probability," which itself comes from probabilis (see probable). The mathematical sense of the term emerged in 1718.

During the 18th century, the term chance was also employed in the mathematical sense of "probability," with its theory often referred to as the "Doctrine of Chances." Chance comes from the Latin term, cadentia, meaning "a fall" or "a case."

The English adjective likely is of Germanic origin, most likely from Old Norse likligr (Old English had geliclic with the same sense), originally meaning "having the appearance of being strong or able" or "having the similar appearance or qualities."

By the mid-15th century, the term likely had also taken on the sense of probably. The derived noun likelihood had a meaning of "similarity" or "resemblance," but took on a meaning of "probability." The meaning "something likely to be true" is from the 1570s.

== Origins ==
Ancient and medieval law of evidence developed a grading of degrees of proof, credibility, presumptions and half-proof to deal with the uncertainties of evidence in court.

In Renaissance times, betting was discussed in terms of odds such as "ten to one" and maritime insurance premiums were estimated based on intuitive risks, but there was no theory on how to calculate such odds or premiums.

The mathematical methods of probability arose in the investigations first of Gerolamo Cardano in the 1560s (not published until 100 years later), and then in the correspondence between Pierre de Fermat and Blaise Pascal (1654) on such questions as the fair division of the stake in an interrupted game of chance. Christiaan Huygens (1657) gave a comprehensive treatment of the subject.

Games of chance such as dice, astragali, talus bone, were widely played in ancient times, but these practices were not accompanied by a systematic theory of probability. The pottery of ancient Greece provides evidence to show that the astragali were tossed into a circle drawn on the floor, much like playing marbles. In Egypt, excavators of tombs found a game they called "Hounds and Jackals", which closely resembles the modern game snakes and ladders. According to Pausanias, Palamedes invented dice during the Trojan wars, although their true origin is uncertain. The first dice game mentioned in literature of the Christian era was called hazard. Played with two or three dice, it was probably brought to Europe by the knights returning from the Crusades. However, such examples illustrate cultural interest in chance rather than mathematical analysis.

Dante Alighieri (1265–1321) mentions this game, and a later commentator, at the time, expanded on its mechanics. With three dice, the lowest possible total is three (each die showing one), while a total of four can be achieved by rolling a two on one die and ones on the other two.

One of the first major steps in determining a mathematical treatment in probability came from Cardano in the sixteenth century as he explored the sum of three dice. For example, there are a total of 27 permutations that sum to 10 but only 25 that sum to 9. In his Liber de Ludo Aleae (written 1560, published 1663), Cardano analyzed gambling problems and introduced the idea that probability can be defined as the ratio of favourable outcomes to total possible outcomes. This work marked the earliest systemic attempt to formalize the study of chance.

The development continued with the correspondences between Pascal and Fermat (1654), who addressed problems such as the fair division of stakes in interrupted games of chance. Their works laid the foundations for modern probability theory. This was followed by Huygens' De ratiociniis in aleae ludo (1657), the first published book on probability, which presented systematic methods for solving gambling problems.

== Seventeenth century ==
Between 1613 and 1623, Galileo also examined the problem of dice throws, noting that some numbers are more likely to appear because there are more combinations that yield them.

The date historians cite as the beginning of modern probability theory is 1654, when Pascal and Fermat began their correspondence addressing gambling problems. Specifically, they analyzed the "problem of points," in which stakes must be fairly divided if a game is interrupted. This correspondence, which started when Antoine Gombaud had sent Pascal and other mathematicians several questions on the practical applications of some of these theories, establishing fundamental principles of expected value and combinatorial analysis, forming the mathematical foundation of probability theory. This marked a crucial step because it provided not just problems, but a general method of expectations, making the idea of a "fair price" for risky positions precise.

Christiaan Huygens built on Pascal and Fermat's ideas in his De ratiociniis in aleae ludo (1657), the first published book devoted entirely to probability. Huygens presented systematic solutions to gambling problems and introduced formulas that could calculate probabilities of different outcomes, making probability a formal mathematical discipline. In 1665 Pascal posthumously published his results on the eponymous Pascal's triangle, an important combinatorial concept. He referred to the triangle in his work Traité du triangle arithmétique (Traits of the Arithmetic Triangle) as the "arithmetic triangle".

In 1662, the book La Logique ou l'Art de Penser was published anonymously in Paris. The authors presumably were Antoine Arnauld and Pierre Nicole, two leading Jansenists, who worked together with Blaise Pascal. The Latin title of this book is Ars cogitandi, which was a successful book on logic of the time. The Ars cogitandi consists of four books, with the fourth one dealing with decision-making under uncertainty by considering the analogy to gambling and explicitly linking probability and rational judgement under uncertainty.

In the field of statistics and applied probability, John Graunt published Natural and Political Observations Made upon the Bills of Mortality also in 1662, initiating the discipline of demography. This work, among other things, gave a statistical estimate of the population of London, produced the first life table, gave probabilities of survival of different age groups, examined the different causes of death, noting that the annual rate of suicide and accident is constant, and commented on the level and stability of sex ratio.

The usefulness and interpretation of Graunt's tables were discussed in a series of correspondences by brothers Ludwig and Christiaan Huygens in 1667, where they realized the difference between mean and median estimates and Christian even interpolated Graunt's life table by a smooth curve, creating the first continuous probability distribution; but their correspondences were not published. In 1670, Pascal introduced the idea, "The Wager," which connects probability to religious philosophy, for the first time. Specifically, Pascal argues that since the expected value of the choice is found by multiplying probability by reward, even if the chance of God existing is extremely small, the reward of eternal happiness makes believing in God the most reasonable choice.

Later, Johan de Witt, the then prime minister of the Dutch Republic, published similar material in his 1671 work Waerdye van Lyf-Renten (A Treatise on Life Annuities), which used statistical concepts to determine life expectancy for practical political purposes; a demonstration of the fact that this sampling branch of mathematics had significant pragmatic applications. De Witt's work was not widely distributed beyond the Dutch Republic, perhaps due to his fall from power and execution by mob in 1672.

Apart from the practical contributions of these two work, they also exposed a fundamental idea that probability can be assigned to events that do not have inherent physical symmetry, such as the chances of dying at certain age, unlike say the rolling of a dice or flipping of a coin, simply by counting the frequency of occurrence. Thus, probability could be more than mere combinatorics.

== Eighteenth century ==
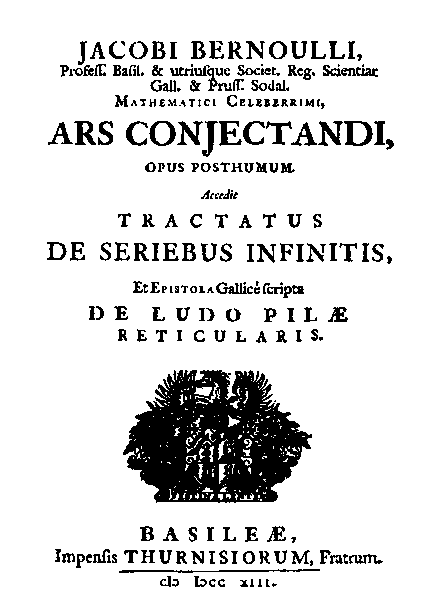
Ars Conjectandi published by Jacob Bernoulli in 1713

In the eighteenth century, probability emerged as a rigorous mathematical discipline with broad applications. Jacob Bernoulli's Ars Conjectandi (posthumous, 1713) introduced the law of large numbers, demonstrating that in a large number of trials the average outcome converges on the expected value. For example, in 1000 throws of a fair coin, it is likely that there are close to 500 heads and 500 tails. Thus, in repeated coin tosses, the proportion of heads approaches 50%.

Abraham De Moivre's The Doctrine of Chances (1718) extended probability calculations to more complex problems, gambling, mortality, and finance, solidifying probability as a tool for both theoretical and practical applications. Jacob Bernoulli's Ars Conjectandi (1713) also gave probability a philosophical dimension by introducing the concept of "moral certainty", and proving the first version of the law of large numbers, justifying why frequencies approximate probabilities in practice.

== Nineteenth century ==
During the nineteenth century, probability became increasingly tied to empirical data and scientific measurement. Gauss applied probabilistic methods to determine the orbit of Ceres from limited observations. This allowed for the development of the method of least squares to correct error-prone measurements. Laplace built on and discussed these developments in his Théorie analytique des probabilités (1812), introducing moment-generating function, method of least squares, inductive probability, and hypothesis testing.

By the late nineteenth century, probability played a crucial role in the development of major scientific advancements. Ludwig Boltzmann and J. Willard Gibbs used probabilistic reasoning to explain thermodynamic properties of gases through the random motion of particles, giving rise to statistical mechanics, a fundamental application of probability to physical science.

The field of the history of probability itself was established by Isaac Todhunter's monumental A History of the Mathematical Theory of Probability from the Time of Pascal to that of Laplace (1865). This work not only catalogued developments from the early correspondence of Pascal and Fermat through the mature theories Laplace, but also framed probability as a coherent mathematical discipline with its own historical trajectory. Toddhunter's book became the first systematic survey of the subject, shaping how later historians approached the narrative of probability evolution.

== Twentieth century ==
Probability and statistics became closely connected through the work on hypothesis testing of R. A. Fisher and Jerzy Neyman. Their contributions formalized statistical inference, introducing tools such as significance testing, confidence intervals, and modern experimental design, which remain central to scientific practice today. A hypothesis, for example that a drug is usually effective, gives rise to a probability distribution that would be observed if the hypothesis is true. If observations approximately agree with the hypothesis, it is confirmed; if not, the hypothesis is rejected.

The theory of stochastic processes broadened into such areas as Markov processes and Brownian motion, the random movement of particles suspended in a fluid. These models influenced not only physics but also economics, inspiring probability based approaches to stock markets. The development of Black–Scholes formula for option pricing is a notable example of probability applied to finance.

The twentieth century also witnessed long running debates on the interpretations of probability. Frequentism, dominant in the mid-century, defined probability as the long running frequency of events. Later, Bayesian methods gained renewed attention, emphasizing probability as a measure of belief or evidence, sparking both philosophical and practical discussions in statistics and decision theory.

The mathematical treatment of probabilities, especially when there are infinitely many possible outcomes, was facilitated by Kolmogorov's axioms (1933). These provided rigorous framework based on measured theory, making it possible to define probabilities for an infinite number of outcomes. This axiomatic system developed into the standard foundation for modern probability and allowed new applications in physics, genetics, and computer science. Kolmogorov also linked his axioms to Cournot's principle, arguing that probability only has empirical meaning if events of vanishingly small probability are treated as practically impossible. This philosophical stance helped reconcile abstract mathematics with real-world application.

== Sources ==
- Bernstein, Peter L. (1996). Against the Gods: The Remarkable Story of Risk. New York: Wiley. ISBN 0-471-12104-5.
- Brakel, J. van (June 1976), "Some Remarks on the Prehistory of the Concept of Statistical Probability", Archive for History of Exact Sciences, 16 (2): 119, doi:10.1007/BF00349634, S2CID 119997834
- Campe, Rüdiger (2012). The Game of Probability. Literature and Calculation from Pascal and Kleist. Stanford University Press. ISBN 9780804768641.
- Collani, Elart von (2006), "Jacob Bernoulli Deciphered", Newsletter of the Bernoulli Society for Mathematical Statistics and Probability, 13 (2)
- Daston, Lorraine (1988). Classical Probability in the Enlightenment. Princeton: Princeton University Press. ISBN 0-691-08497-1.
- Franklin, James (2001). The Science of Conjecture: Evidence and Probability Before Pascal. Baltimore, MD: Johns Hopkins University Press. ISBN 0-8018-6569-7.
- Hacking, Ian (1971), "Jacques Bernoulli's Art of Conjecturing", The British Journal for the Philosophy of Science, 22 (3): 209–229, doi:10.1093/bjps/22.3.209
- Hacking, Ian (2006). The Emergence of Probability (2nd ed.). New York: Cambridge University Press. ISBN 978-0-521-86655-2.
- Hald, Anders (2003). A History of Probability and Statistics and Their Applications before 1750. Hoboken, NJ: Wiley. ISBN 0-471-47129-1.
- Hald, Anders (1998). A History of Mathematical Statistics from 1750 to 1930. New York: Wiley. ISBN 0-471-17912-4.
- Heyde, C. C.; Seneta, E., eds. (2001). Statisticians of the Centuries. New York: Springer. ISBN 0-387-95329-9.
- Lightner, J. E. (1991). A Brief Look at the History of Probability and Statistics. The Mathematics Teacher, 84(8), 623–630. http://www.jstor.org/stable/27967334
- McGrayne, Sharon Bertsch (2011). The Theory That Would Not Die: How Bayes' Rule Cracked the Enigma Code, Hunted Down Russian Submarines, and Emerged Triumphant from Two Centuries of Controversy. New Haven: Yale University Press. ISBN 9780300169690.
- Ore, O. (1960). Pascal and the Invention of Probability Theory. The American Mathematical Monthly, 67(5), 409–419. https://doi.org/10.2307/2309286
- von Plato, Jan (1994). Creating Modern Probability: Its Mathematics, Physics and Philosophy in Historical Perspective. New York: Cambridge University Press. ISBN 978-0-521-59735-7.
- Salsburg, David (2001). The Lady Tasting Tea: How Statistics Revolutionized Science in the Twentieth Century. Henry Holt and Company. ISBN 0-7167-4106-7.
- Shafer, Glenn (1996), "The Significance of Jacob Bernoulli's Ars Conjectandi for the Philosophy of Probability Today" (PDF), Journal of Econometrics, vol. 75, no. 1, pp. 15–32, CiteSeerX 10.1.1.407.1066, doi:10.1016/0304-4076(95)01766-6
- Shafer, G. (1993). The Early Development of Mathematical Probability.
- Shafer, Glenn; Vovk, Vladimir (2018). "The origins and legacy of Kolmogorov's Grundbegriffe". arXiv:1802.06071 [math.HO].
- Stigler, Stephen M. (1990). The History of Statistics: The Measurement of Uncertainty before 1900. Belknap Press/Harvard University Press. ISBN 0-674-40341-X.
