= Mavhunga =

Mavhunga is a surname. Notable people with the surname include:

- Clapperton Chakanetsa Mavhunga, Zimbabwean-American professor
- Maxwell Mavhunga, Zimbabwean politician
- Monicah Mavhunga, Zimbabwean politician
