= Aby Warburg Prize =

- Awarded for: Science prize
- Sponsored by: City of Hamburg
- Location: Hamburg
- Country: Germany
- Reward: €25,000
- First award: 1980
- Website: www.hamburg.de/bkm/kulturpreise/3605240/aby-warburg-preis/

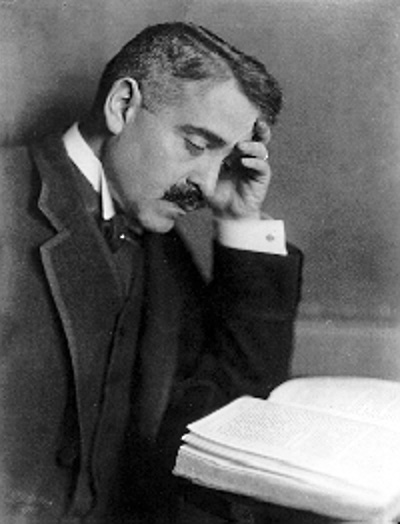

The Aby Warburg Prize (German Aby Warburg-Preis; formerly Aby M. Warburg-Preis) is a science prize of the city of Hamburg. It was established in 1979. Since 1980, it is donated by the senate of the city for excellence in the humanities and social sciences. It is named after the Hamburg-born art historian Aby Warburg. The prize is worth 25,000 Euros and awarded every four years. Young scientists will receive a scholarship of 10,000 euros.

== Award winners ==
- 1980 Jan Białostocki, art historian
- 1984 Meyer Schapiro, art historian
- 1988 Michael Baxandall, art historian
- 1992 Carlo Ginzburg, historian
- 1996 Claude Lévi-Strauss, anthropologist and ethnologist
- 2000 Natalie Zemon Davis, historian
- 2002 Rüdiger Campe, professor of German literature
- 2004 Horst Bredekamp, art historian
- 2008 Werner Hofmann, art historian
- 2012 Martin Warnke, art historian
- 2016 Sigrid Weigel, professor of German literature
- 2020 Georges Didi-Huberman, art historian
- 2024 Eva Illouz, sociologist

== See also ==
- List of social sciences awards
