= The devil is in the details =

Idiom about hidden complications

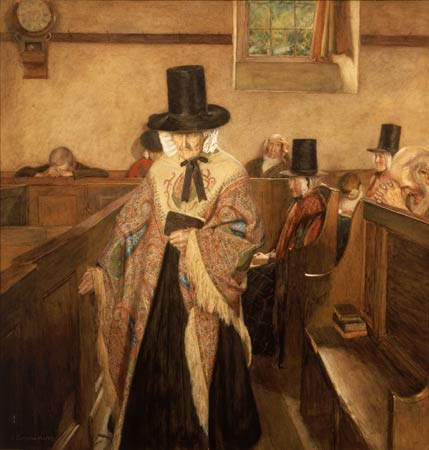
The 1908 artwork Salem is famous for a contentious belief that the devil is depicted within the detail of the lead figure's shawl.

"The devil is in the details" is an idiom alluding to a catch or mysterious element hidden in the details; it indicates that "something may seem simple, but in fact the details are complicated and likely to cause problems". It comes from the earlier phrase "God is in the details", expressing the idea that whatever one does should be done thoroughly; that is, details are important.

== Origin ==
The idiom "God is in the details" has been attributed to a number of people, most notably to the German-born architect Ludwig Mies van der Rohe (1886–1969) by The New York Times in Mies's 1969 obituary; however, it is generally accepted not to have originated with him. A German version, Der liebe Gott steckt im Detail, is widely attributed to the German art historian Aby Warburg (1866–1929). According to Christopher Johnson, Der liebe Gott steckt im Detail was the subtitle of a seminar Warburg taught at the University of Hamburg in the winter of 1925-26. A French version of the saying, "Le bon Dieu est dans le détail" (literally "the good God is in the detail") is generally attributed to Gustave Flaubert (1821–1880). The expression "the devil is in the details" is found in a 1963 history of post-war European integration. It is later attested in 1965. In 1969, it is referred to as an existing proverb. Bartlett's Familiar Quotations lists the saying's author as anonymous. An editorial in the 1989 New York Times reflected on the apparent interchangeability of God and the Devil in the phrase, citing various examples in print at the time; as well as the difficulty of determining which came first and how long either one has been in use.

== Variants ==
The phrase has several variants: (the/a) Devil (is) in the detail(s). The original expression as, "God is in the detail" with the word detail being singular, colloquial usage often ends the idiom as details plural; where the word detail without an s can be used as both a singular and collective noun.

When referring to the finer points of legislation, former US House Speaker Nancy Pelosi observed, "The devil and the angels are in the details."

More recently, the expressions "governing is in the details" and "the truth, if it exists, is in the details" have appeared.
