= Martin Warnke =

German art historian (1937–2019)

- Born: 12 October 1937; Ijuí, Brazil
- Died: 11 December 2019 (aged 82); Halle, Germany
- Occupation: Art historian

Martin Warnke (12 October 1937 – 11 December 2019) was a German art historian.

== Life and work ==
Warnke grew up in a German pastor's family in Brazil. He studied art history, history and German literature at the universities of Munich, Madrid and Berlin. In 1963, he wrote a Ph.D. thesis on Peter Paul Rubens at the Free University of Berlin under Hans Kauffmann. In 1964 and 1965, he worked at the Berlin museums. In 1970, he completed his Habilitationsschrift on court art at the Westfälische Wilhelms-Universität Münster. From 1971 to 1978 he was a professor of art history at the University of Marburg. In 1979, he moved to the University of Hamburg, where he taught art history until his retirement in 2003.

Warnke represented a research direction that is particularly focused on the social history of art. He directed the Center for Political Iconography at the Warburg Haus, Hamburg. Here he devoted himself to the work of the important cultural theorist, Aby Warburg.

Warnke was a member of the Deutsche Akademie für Sprache und Dichtung and the Committee on the Preservation of German Cultural Heritage. From 1983 to 1984, he was a member of the Institute for Advanced Study, Berlin. In 1987, he was a fellow at the Getty Research Institute in Santa Monica, California. From 1998 to 1999, he was a member of the Collegium Budapest - Institute for Advanced Study.

Warnke died on 11 December 2019 in Halle, Germany, at the age of 82.

== Publications ==
- Kommentare zu Rubens. Berlin 1965.
- Flämische Malerei des 17. Jahrhunderts in der Gemäldegalerie Berlin. Berlin 1967.
- Das Kunstwerk zwischen Wissenschaft und Weltanschauung. Gütersloh 1970.
- Bau und Überbau: Soziologie der mittelalterlichen Architektur nach den Schriftquellen. Frankfurt am Main 1976.
- Peter Paul Rubens: Leben und Werk. Cologne 1977.
- Cranachs Luther: Entwürfe für ein Image. Frankfurt am Main 1984.
- Politische Landschaft: Zur Kunstgeschichte der Natur. Munich 1992.
- Hofkünstler: Zur Vorgeschichte des modernen Künstlers. 2nd edition, Cologne 1996.
- Geschichte der deutschen Kunst in drei Bänden, Vol. 2: Spätmittelalter und Frühe Neuzeit 1400–1750. Munich 1999.
- Bildwirklichkeiten. Göttingen 2005.
- Velázquez: Form & Reform. Cologne 2005.
- Peter Paul Rubens. Cologne 2006.
- Könige als Künstler. Münster 2007.
- (with Uwe Fleckner and Hendrik Ziegler), Handbuch der politischen Ikonographie. Vol. 1: Abdankung bis Huldigung. Vol. 2: Imperator bis Zwerg. 2nd edition. Munich 2011.
- Zeitgenossenschaft: Zum Auschwitz-Prozess 1964. Zurich 2014.

== Awards ==
- 1990: Gottfried Wilhelm Leibniz Prize of the Deutsche Forschungsgemeinschaft
- 2006: Prize of the Gerda Henkel Stiftung
- 2012: Aby Warburg Prize
