= Clapperton Chakanetsa Mavhunga =

Zimbabwean professor of science and technology

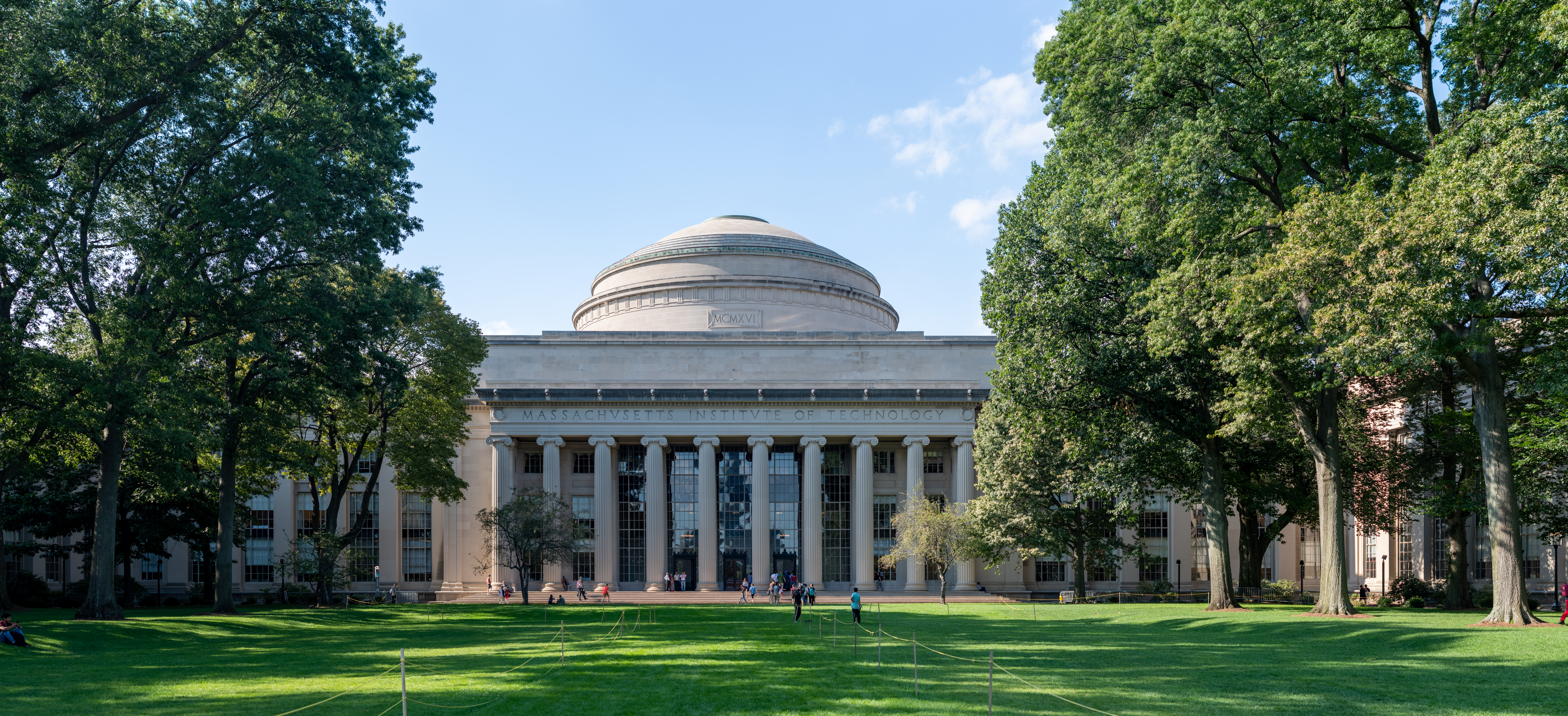
The image above is the dome of MIT, the place where Mavhunga was an assistant professor, and became a full professor in 2020. In case you are not aware, MIT stands for Massachusetts Institute of Technology.

Clapperton Chakanetsa Mavhunga is a Zimbabwean professor of science, technology, and society at the Massachusetts Institute of Technology (MIT). His research interests are in the history, theory, and practice of science, technology, innovation in Africa, as well as environmental history and mobility studies.

== Education ==
Mavhunga earned his bachelor's degree in history at the University of Zimbabwe, and a master's degree in History and International Relations at the University of the Witswatersrand in 1996 and 2000 respectively. He worked for three years as a lecturer at the University of Zimbabwe before moving to the United States, where he received his PhD in history at the University of Michigan. He is the first graduate of the University of Michigan's Science, Technology and Society (STS) Program.

== Career ==
Upon completing his doctorate programme in 2008, Mavhunga joined MIT as an assistant professor. He rose to become a full professor at the university in 2020. He teaches courses on technology in history, technology and innovation in Africa, and energy, environment and society in the university's STS Program.

Mavhunga is the author of Transient Workspaces: Technologies of Everyday Innovation in Zimbabwe. The book was a finalist for the Turku Book Prize awarded by the European Society for Environmental History and Rachel Carson Center for Environment and Society, and received honorable mention for the Herskovits Prize (African Studies Association Best Book Prize) in 2015. His second monograph, The Mobile Workshop: The Tsetse Fly and African Knowledge Production, explores how the presence of the tsetse fly turned the African forest into an open laboratory where African knowledge formed the basis of colonial tsetse control policies. He is also the editor of a volume entitled What Do Science, Technology, and Innovation Mean from Africa? In November 2023, Mavhunga released his third monograph, Dare to Invent the Future: Knowledge in the Service of and through Problem-Solving, which took its title from one of Thomas Sankara's most inspirational speeches.

His articles have been published in several academic journals including Social Text, Public Culture, History and Technology, Comparative Technology Transfer and Society, Journal of International, Affairs, Thresholds, Transfers, Oryx, Journal of Higher Education in Africa, Historia, and Journal of Southern African Studies.

Mavhunga has been a visiting professor or research fellow at the University of the Witswatersrand and the University of the Western Cape (as a Carnegie African Diaspora Fellow), Max Planck Institute for the History of Science, the Rachel Carson Center, CODESRIA, POIESIS (Gerda Henkel Fellowship Program), and the International Research Institute for Cultural Techniques and Media Philosophy (IKKM).

Mavhunga has been invited to give keynotes and lectures at various conferences and fora, including at the annual conferences of the Society for the History of Technology, the International Association for the History of Transport, Traffic and Mobility, and at the Futures Conference. In 2017, he gave a talk at the TEDGlobal in Arusha entitled: "Training Critical Thinker-Doers", and at Talks at Google entitled "African Innovation".

== Selected publications ==
Mavhunga, C. C. Dare to Invent the Future: Knowledge in the Service of and Through Problem-solving. MIT Press, 2023.

Mavhunga, C. C. Transient Workspaces: Technologies of Everyday Innovation in Zimbabwe. MIT Press, 2014.

Mavhunga, C. C. The Mobile Workshop: The Tsetse Fly and African Knowledge Production. MIT Press, 2018.

Mavhunga, C. C. (ed.). What do Science, Technology, and Innovation Mean from Africa? The MIT Press, 2017.
