= Sigrid Weigel =

German literary scholar (born 1950)

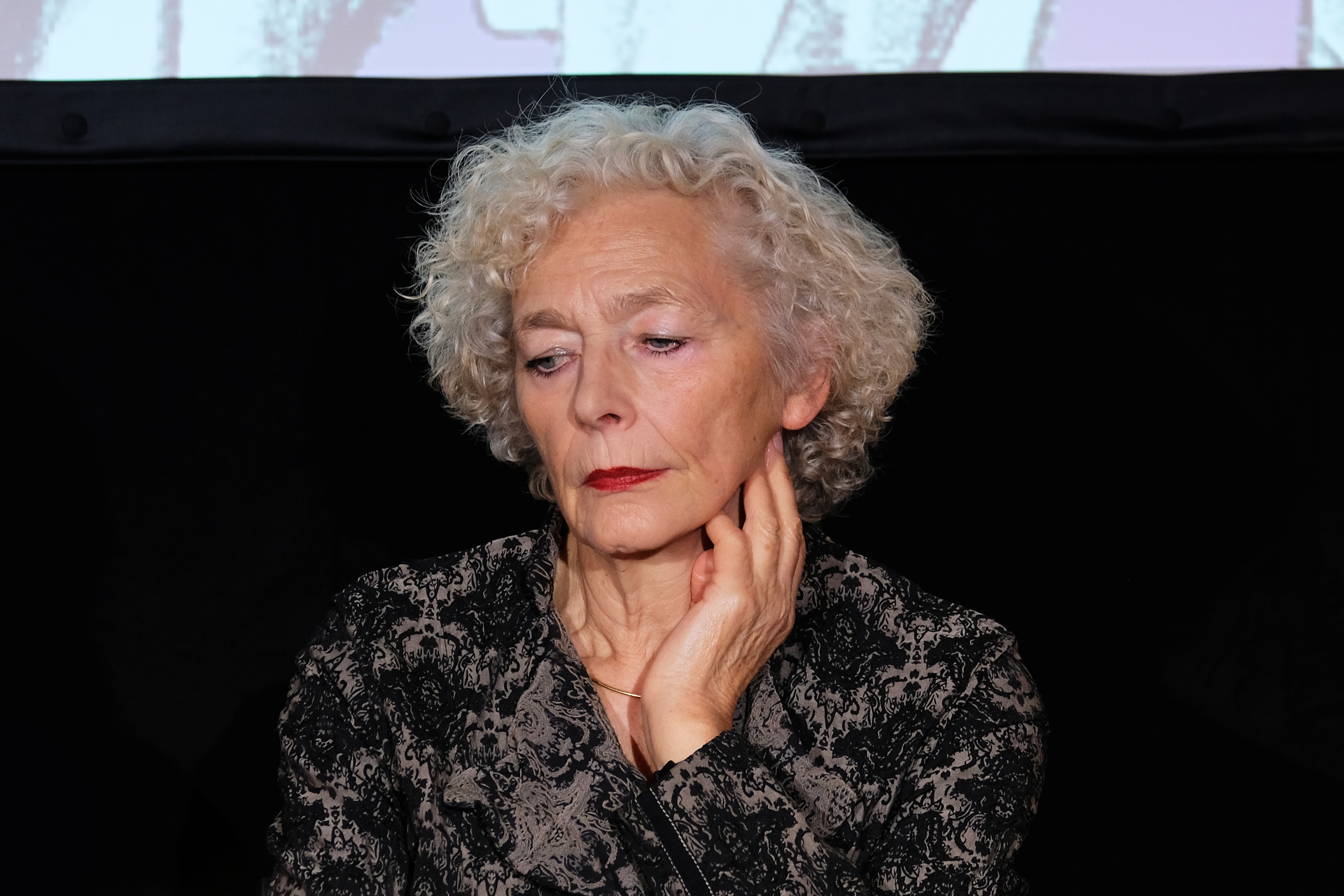
Sigrid Weigel, 2023

Sigrid Weigel (born March 25, 1950, Hamburg) is a German scholar of literary studies, critical theory, a specialist of cross-disciplinary research, and a leading scholar of Walter Benjamin, Aby Warburg, and the cultural science (Kulturwissenschaft) around 1900. She held professorships at Hamburg, Zürich, and Berlin and established the internationally noted Advanced Studies “Center for Literary and Cultural Research” (ZfL, Zentrum für Literatur- und Kulturforschung) in Berlin. In 2016, she received the renowned Aby Warburg Prize of the City of Hamburg.

== Career ==
Weigel received her Ph.D. in 1977 from University of Hamburg and her habilitation in 1986 from Marburg University. Since 1978 she taught Literary Studies at Hamburg University, where she was appointed professor in 1984. As member of the director's board of the Institute for Advanced Study in the Humanities (KWI) Essen from 1990 to 1993 she conducted interdisciplinary fellow groups on ‘memory research’ and 'topography of gender'. From 1993 to 1998 she served as professor at Zürich University, where she initiated an annual poetry lecture (W. G. Sebald presented his "Air Warfare and Literature" here in 1997) and public university lectures responding to Switzerland's “Nazi gold affair”. From 1998 to 2000 she acted as the director of the Einstein Forum Potsdam. From 1999 to 2015 she was professor at Technische Universität Berlin and director of the independent Center for Literary and Cultural Research Berlin (ZfL), which during this period developed "into a prominent, nationally and internationally acknowledged research center [...] and a leading place in Germany for theoretical discussions in the humanities between approaches of historic philology and cultural science, on the one hand, and for an interdisciplinary approach to natural and technical sciences on the other" (German Science Council, 2006). She founded the semi-annual journal Trajekte and a program of prominent Honorary Members (Ginzburg, Kristeva, Didi-Huberman, Bhabha et al.). The centre is an example of successful collaboration between the academic cultures of East and West Germany, because scholars of the former GDR-Academy of Sciences formed research teams in collaboration with scholars from the old FRG. Weigel regularly gives guest seminars, summer courses, and PhD-workshops abroad; from 2005 to 2016 she served as permanent Visiting Professor at the German Dept. of Princeton University.

== Scholarship / Ideas ==
Literary Studies

Her early publications are dedicated to non-canonised genres (leaflet-literature of 1848-revolution, prisoners’ literature). Her still influential writings on gender studies and the literary history of female authors (e.a. the first survey on contemporary literature in German Die Stimme der Medusa) contributed significantly to the establishment of gender studies in German universities during the 1980s. The comprehensive monography on Ingeborg Bachmann (1999), which for the first time used the archive of the author's correspondents (such as Adorno, Scholem, Hildesheimer, the editor of Merkur et al.,) radically changed the image of Bachmann as author and intellectual. Other authors of Weigel's publications include William Shakespeare, Heinrich Kleist, Heinrich Heine, Sigmund Freud, Aby Warburg, Walter Benjamin, Gershom Scholem, Hannah Arendt, Jakob Taubes, Susan Taubes, Alfred Andersch, Ingeborg Bachmann, Christa Wolf, Unica Zürn, and Yoko Tawada (who did her PhD with her).

Memory and restitution post-1945

The aftermath of WWII and holocaust form a continuous commitment of her work, with contributions to memory, trauma, trans-generationality, testimony, restitution and the problematic conversion of guilt into debts (Schuld/Schulden).

First cultural science (Kulturwissenschaft)

The name 'first cultural science' (Kulturwissenschaft) coined by Weigel, refers to a constellation of intellectual history around 1900, when predominantly Jewish German-speaking authors such as Sigmund Freud, Aby Warburg, Georg Simmel, Ernst Cassirer, Helmuth Plessner, Walter Benjamin et al. transgressed disciplines to study boundary cases and the afterlife (Nachleben) of religion, myth, and ritual in modern culture. Their ideas, emerging from the reverse side of Europe's nationalist and colonial past, anticipate several components of critical theory, e.g. a non-teleologic theory of history and correspondences between European and non-European cultures. Whereas violently disrupted by Nazi-Germany, the intellectual legacy of Kulturwissenschaft found successors in authors such as Gershom Scholem, Hannah Arendt, Stéphane Mosès and Susan Taubes. Weigel engaged herself to the archive of this intellectual history by means of editions, including Warburg's Writings in One Volume and the first comprehensive edition of Scholem's Poetica.

The topics of her cultural science- publications include: the history of the generation concept, genealogy, the topographical turn, figures of martyrdom in religious-cultural history, testimony, compassion, selftranslation, the voice, and opera.

Walter Benjamin

For Weigel, Benjamin's thinking is "neither theological nor secular", but shaped by a subtle interplay between the biblical and profane language register. Her work is dedicated to his characteristic thought-figures (such as legibility, historical index, topography/ site, body and image space, awakening), to his epistemological threshold knowledge (Schwellenkunde), his image-based epistemology, and his music theory. In contrast to Giorgio Agamben, she emphasises the differences between Benjamin and Carl Schmitt by discussing their theories of ‘sovereignty’ from the perspective of the respective opposing figures (martyrs and partisans) and shows, that the apparent proximity of both authors is partly due to distorted translations, e. g. "exceptional cases" for "ungeheure Fälle” (monstrous or tremendous cases).

Image theory

Grammatology of Images (2015), evaluated as “the most integral image theory we currently have”, and standard work in image scholarship, develops an image theory of the an-iconic. Departing from Derrida's statement “The trace must be thought before the existing”, her theory addresses traces preceding the image in contrast to the conventional concept of the trace left behind. At centre is the question of imaging (Bildgebung): of how something that is not visibly accessible (e.g. feelings, sadness, honour, shame, transcendent phenomena, thinking) becomes an image. The book discusses indexical images, effigies, cult image as well as case studies of the face, caricature, and angels.

Cross disciplinary scholarship of humanities and natural sciences

“The boundary between the body accessible to empirical methods and the language in the broadest sense (including gestures, feelings, images, music, etc.) which demands deciphering and understanding, is the hot zone of research: contested area and a promising field of interdisciplinary scholarship at the same time. In this respect, there exists little border traffic so far,” as Weigel argues and pleads “For a broad border traffic”. She conducted cross-disciplinary projects in collaboration with biology, medicine, neuroscience and clinical psychoanalysis, e.g. on heredity and evolution, on surgery, on Sigmund Freud and neuroscience, and on empathy in philosophy and laboratory research; and she initiated research on the ‘History of Interdisciplinary Ideas’, viz. concepts used in various disciplines with different meanings. In recent years, her scholarship is occupied with the face and facial expressions. The exhibition on The Face conceptualized for the German Hygiene Museum Dresden (DHMD) achieved great public success.

Transnational cultural policy

Her study Transnational Foreign Cultural Policy – Beyond National Culture, commissioned by the Institute for International Relations (ifa) in 2019, provoked a public debate on fundamental contradictions between the goals of foreign cultural policy (support of human rights, civil society and sustainable economy) and the German economic and domestic policy in general. Weigel pleads for the regular implantation of the knowledge of experts of foreign cultural policy in the political decision processes of other ministries. Her study includes a critical analysis of the idea of the Kulturnation (cultural nation), an idea developed during the 19th century discourse upon the nation, which reinforced the xenophobic elements of the pre-WWI-ideology in Germany.

== Honours ==
- 2016: Aby Warburg Prize of the City of Hamburg.
- 2015: Honorary doctorate from the Universidad Nacional de General San Martín in Buenos Aires.
- 2015: Honorary doctorate from Ilia State University in Tbilisi, Georgia.
- 2007: Honorary doctorate from the Catholic University of Leuven, Belgium.
- 1999: Science Prize from the Aby Warburg Foundation.
- Honorary Member of the Modern Language Association (MLA) since 2000.
- Member of the Academia Europaea since 2007.
- Honorary President of the International Walter Benjamin Society since 2009.

== Bibliography ==
For a complete bibliography: Prof. Dr. Dr. h.c. mult. Sigrid Weigel - ZfL Berlin

== Books ==
- (2019) Transnational Foreign Policy – Beyond National Culture. Prerequisites and Perspectives of the Intersection of Domestic and Foreign Policy (Stuttgart: ifa Edition Culture and Foreign Policy)
- (2017) Schädel Basis Wissen I. Kultur und Geschichte der chirurgischen Korrektur der Schädelform (co-author, Berlin: Kadmos)
- (2015) Grammatologie der Bilder (Berlin: Suhrkamp 2015), engl. Grammatlogy of Images, transl. by Chadwick Truscott Smith (Fordham University Press, forthcoming)
- (2008) Walter Benjamin. Die Kreatur, das Heilige, die Bilder (Frankfurt/M.: Fischer 2008); engl. Walter Benjamin. Images, the Creaturely, and the Holy, transl. by Chadwick Truscott Smith (Stanford University Press 2013)
- (2006) Die “innere Spannung im alphanumerischen Code” (Flusser). Buchstabe und Zahl in grammatologischer und wissenschaftsgeschichtlicher Perspektive (Köln: Walter König)
- (2006) Genea-Logik. Generation, Tradition und Evolution zwischen Kultur- und Naturwissenschaften (München: Fink)
- (2004) Literatur als Voraussetzung der Kulturgeschichte. Schauplätze von Shakespeare bis Benjamin (München: Fink)
- (1999) Ingeborg Bachmann. Hinterlassenschaften unter Wahrung des Briefgeheimnisses (Wien: Zsolnay; paperback München: dtv 2003); chap. transl. in engl. „Reading the City: Between Memory-image and Distorted Topography. Ingeborg Bachmann's Essays on Rome (1955) and Berlin (1964),” in: St. Spier (Ed.), Urban Visions. Experiencing and Envisioning the city, Liverpool University Press 2002, 23–36.
- (1997) Entstellte Ähnlichkeit. Walter Benjamins theoretische Schreibweise (Frankfurt/M.: Fischer)
- (1996) Body- and Image Space. Re-Reading Walter Benjamin (London: Routledge)
- (1994) Bilder des kulturellen Gedächtnisses. Beiträge zur Gegenwartsliteratur (Dülmen-Hiddingsel: Tende).
- (1990) Topographien der Geschlechter. Kulturgeschichtliche Studien zur Literatur (Reinbek bei Hamburg: Rowohlt)
- (1986) Neun Autorinnenporträts – Von Aichinger bis Zürn (co-author, Frankfurt/M.: Fischer, reprint 2017)
- (1984) Die Stimme der Medusa. Schreibweisen in der Gegenwartsliteratur von Frauen (Dülmen-Hiddingsel: Tende, 2nd ed.1994, paperback Reinbek bei Hamburg: Rowohlt 1989)
- (1983) Die verborgene Frau. Sechs Beiträge zu einer feministischen Literaturwissenschaft (co-author, Berlin: Argument).
- (1982) „Und selbst im Kerker frei …!“ Schreiben im Gefängnis. Zur Theorie und Gattungsgeschichte der Gefängnisliteratur 1750–1933 (Marburg/Lahn: Guttandin & Hoppe)
- (1979) Flugschriftenliteratur 1848 in Berlin. Geschichte und Öffentlichkeit einer volkstümlichen Gattung (Stuttgart: Metzler)

== Edited Volumes in English ==
- (2017) Empathy. Epistemic Problems and Cultural-Historical Perspectives of a Cross-Disciplinary Concept (co-editor., Basingstoke: Palgrave Macmillan)
- (2017) Testimony/ Bearing Witness. Epistemology, Ethics, History and Culture (co-editor, Rowman & Littlefield)
- (2016) A Neuro-Psychoanalytical Dialogue for Bridging Freud and the Neurosciences (co-editor, Luxemburg: Springer)
- (2012) „Escape to Life“. German Intellectuals in New York. A Compendium on Exile after 1933 (co-editor, Berlin: de Gruyter)
- (2011) WissensKünste. The knowledge of the arts and the art of knowledge – Das Wissen der Künste und die Kunst des Wissens (co-editor, Weimar: VDG)

== Editions ==
- (2019) Gershom Scholem, Poetica. Schriften zur Literatur, Übersetzungen, Gedichte (co-editor, Berlin: Suhrkamp)
- (2010) Aby Warburg, Schriften in einem Band (co-editor, Berlin: Suhrkamp)
- (2010) Stéphane Mosès: Momentaufnahmen. = Instantanés. German and French (Berlin: Suhrkamp)
- Susan Taubes: Schriften. 3 (in 4) Vol. (München: Fink 2011ff.)
  - Vol. 1, 1: Die Korrespondenz mit Jacob Taubes 1950–1951, ed. Ch. Pareigis, 2011
  - Vol. 1, 2: Die Korrespondenz mit Jacob Taubes 1952, ed. Ch. Pareigis, 2014
  - Vol. 2: Philosophische Schriften, ed. Th. Macho, J. Steizinger (forthcoming.)
  - Vol. 3: Prosaschriften, ed. Ch. Pareigis. 2015

== Edited Volumes (selection) ==
- (2017) Das Gesicht. Bilder, Medien, Formate (Göttingen: Wallstein)
- (2013) Gesichter. Kulturgeschichtliche Szenen aus der Arbeit am Bildnis des Menschen (Paderborn: Fink)
- (2013) Grundordnungen. Geographie, Religion und Gesetz (co-editor, Berlin: Kadmos)
- (2010) Heine und Freud. Die Enden der Literatur und die Anfänge der Kulturwissenschaft (Berlin: Kadmos)
- (2008) Benjamin-Studien 1 (co-editor, München: Fink); (2011) Vol. 2; (2014) Vol. 3.
- (2007) Märtyrer-Porträts. Von Opfertod, Blutzeugen und heiligen Kriegern (Paderborn: Fink)
- (2002) Genealogie und Genetik. Schnittstellen zwischen Biologie und Kulturgeschichte (Berlin: Akademie-Verlag)
- (2002) Zwischen Rauschen und Offenbarung. Zur Kultur- und Mediengeschichte der Stimme (co-editor, Berlin: Akademie-Verlag)
- (2000) Gershom Scholem. Literatur und Rhetorik (co-editor, Köln: Böhlau)
- (2000) Zeugnis und Zeugenschaft. Jahrbuch Einstein Forum 1999 (Berlin: Akademie Verlag)
- (1999) Trauma. Zwischen Psychoanalyse und kulturellem Deutungsmuster (co-editor, Köln: Böhlau)
- (1997) Ingeborg Bachmann und Paul Celan. Poetische Korrespondenzen (co-editor, Frankfurt/M. Suhrkamp)
- (1995) Flaschenpost und Postkarte. Korrespondenzen zwischen Kritischer Theorie und Poststrukturalismus (Köln: Böhlau)
- (1992) Leib- und Bildraum. Lektüren nach Benjamin (Köln: Böhlau)
- (1984) Ingeborg Bachmann. Special Issue, Text und Kritik (München)
