= Mary Warburg (artist) =

German painter and sculptor (1866–1934)

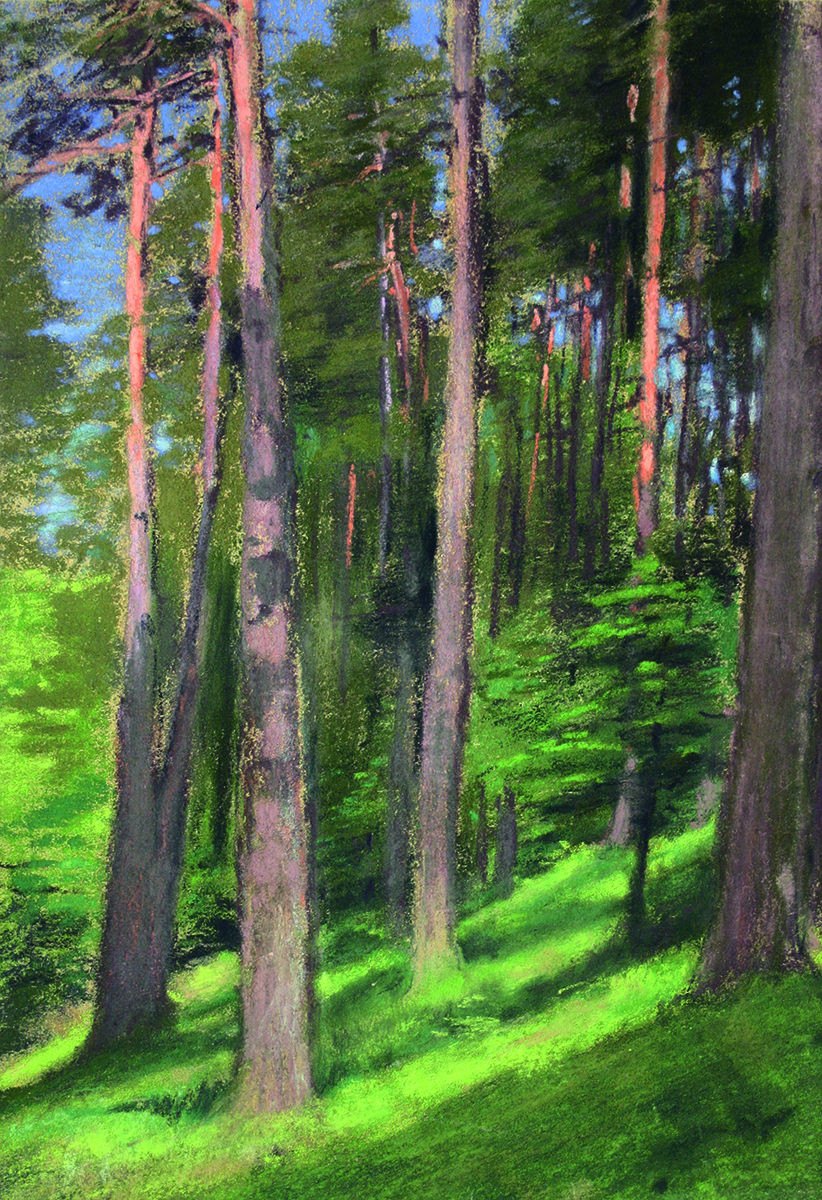
Mary Warburg, Pine trees on a hillside (circa 1893), pastel, Hamburger Kunsthalle, photo: A. Völker

Mary Warburg (October 13, 1866 – December 4, 1934), born Mary Hertz, was a German painter and sculptor. She was married to the art historian Aby Warburg, the founder of the Warburg Institute, London.

Mary Warburg was a daughter of the Hamburg senator and merchant Adolph Ferdinand Hertz and his wife Maria, née Goßler. From the age of 16 she took private drawing lessons and often travelled with her father. She married Aby Warburg in 1897. They moved to Florence, where Mary Warburg entered into artistic exchange with the sculptor Adolf Hildebrand and the painter Arnold Böcklin. After four years, the Warburgs returned to Hamburg.

Mary Warburg created drawings, pastels, watercolours – landscapes as well as portraits and figurative studies – and sculptures. She exhibited her works from the 1890s in Hamburg, where the director of the Hamburger Kunsthalle, Alfred Lichtwark, was a prominent supporter of her art. She contributed illustrations to several publications such as the magazine Pan (1896/97). Her sculptures after her marriage depict friends and family members.

In 1930, she completed her most prominent artwork, the bust of her husband Aby Warburg, copies of which are on display in the Hamburger Kunsthalle, the Warburg-Haus in Hamburg and the Warburg Institute, London. More of her works are kept in the Hamburger Kunsthalle as well as in private collections. In spring 2022, the Ernst Barlach House in Hamburg dedicated an exhibition to her works.

== Literature ==
- Ute Haug: Mary Warburg, geb. Hertz – Künstlerin der Avantgarde?, in: Ulrich Luckhardt (ed.): Künstlerinnen der Avantgarde in Hamburg zwischen 1890 und 1933. exhibition catalogue, Hamburger Kunsthalle, Vol. 1, Hamburg 2006, p. 29–49 [German].
- Bernd Roeck: Florenz 1900. Die Suche nach Arkadien. C. H. Beck, Munich 2001 [German].
- Bärbel Hedinger, Michael Diers: Mary Warburg. Porträt einer Künstlerin. Leben | Werk. In collaboration with Andrea Völker. Hirmer, Munich 2020 [German].
