= Pathosformel =

Art Term

Pathosformel or "pathos formula" (German plural: Pathosformeln) is a term coined by the German art historian and cultural theorist Aby Warburg (1866–1929) in his research on the afterlife of antiquity (das Nachleben der Antike). It is described as "the primitive words of passionate gesture language" and the "emotionally charged visual trope[s] that recur throughout images in Western Europe. While the term is associated with formalism, Warburg restricts the concept to cultural-psychological themes, as he held "an honest disgust of aestheticizing art history". Despite its name, pathosformel does not provide a calculable formula to identify visual links among images. Instead, it calls on collective and individual imagination to find such links apart from those based on age, type, size, or origin. In historian Kurt Forster's words, "it exerts its control over existing figurations in a way that endows them with new, 'sign-giving' qualities." The art historian Ernst Gombrich described pathosformel as "the primeval reaction of man to the universal hardships of his existence [that] underlies all his attempts at mental orientation".

Botticelli's The Birth of Venus c. 1486.

Warburg's early work on paintings by Botticelli and Ghirlandaio as well as his later work on the reappearance of astrological symbols in artwork and popular ephemera employ the concept of pathosformel. His dissertation, completed in 1893, presents an early formulation of the concept in comparing Botticelli's Birth of Venus with Primavera by looking at the bewegtes Beiwerk or "animated incident" that appears among them. To Warburg, this incident is the depiction of wind that animates the paintings. In the former, it is seen in Venus's flowing hair, while in the latter, it is seen in the flowing dress of the nymph Flora on the far right.

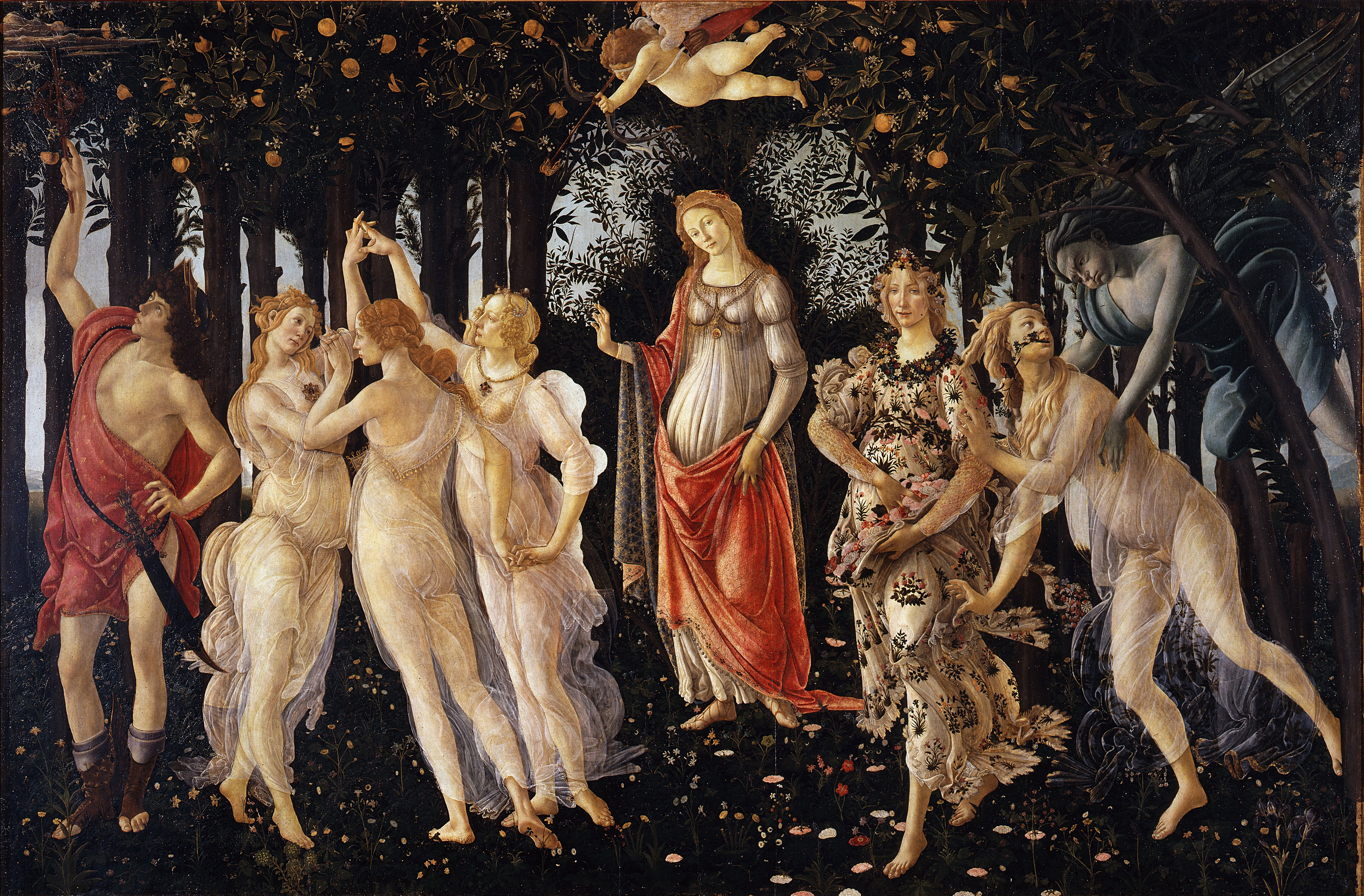
Botticelli's Primavera c. 1482.

In 1905, Warburg presented a lecture on Dürer and Italian Antiquity, in which he used pathosformel to approach images by Dürer, Andrea Mantegna, Antonio Pollaiuolo and others from the point of view of a historical psychology of human expression.

Warburg's unfinished montage, the Mnemosyne Atlas provides another example of the pathosformel. There, Warburg pairs a Dürer engraving from Apocalypse with Pictures (1498) with an image featured in a popular tarot illustrated by the same artist (1494/5). While the image of the chariot links these works compositionally, the chariot itself signifies for Warburg the need to control a potentially disastrous conflict, thus linking similar psychological dynamics in different works regardless of their high or low cultural origins. Warburg acknowledged, however, that the persistence of a motif does not necessarily carry with it the same meaning.

Pathosformel is closely related to, albeit distinct from Robert Vischer's notion of empathy (Einfühlung), which Warburg refers to as the "force active in the generation of style".

== See also ==
- Aby Warburg
- Jungian archetypes
- Einfühlung
- Affect theory
