= Thomas Hoepker =

German photographer (1936–2024)

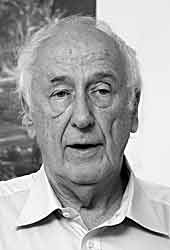
- Hoepker in 2009
- Born: 10 June 1936; Munich, Germany
- Died: 10 July 2024 (aged 88); Santiago, Chile
- Occupation: Photographer
- Organizations: Stern; Magnum Photos
- Known for: View from Williamsburg, Brooklyn, on Manhattan, 9/11

Thomas Martin Renatus Hoepker (German: Thomas Höpker; 10 June 1936 – 10 July 2024) was a German photographer and member of Magnum Photos. He was known for stylish color photo features, working from the 1960s for Stern and Geo on assignments around the globe as a photojournalist with a desire to photograph human conditions. He made an iconic pair of images of boxer Muhammad Ali, and a controversial photograph of people with the 9/11 World Trade Center destruction in the background, View from Williamsburg, Brooklyn, on Manhattan, 9/11.

== Life and career ==
Hoepker was born in Munich on 10 June 1936, the son of journalist Wolfgang Höpker and Sigrid von Klösterlein. The family moved to Albertaich after their apartment in Mandlstraße was bombed during World War Two.

He first began taking pictures when he received an old 9 × 12 glass plate camera from his grandfather for his 14th birthday. He developed his prints in his family's kitchen and bathroom, and began to earn a little money by selling pictures to friends and classmates. Hoepker studied art history and archaeology from 1956 to 1959 at the Ludwig-Maximilians-Universität München and the University of Göttingen, where he learned about understanding images and composition. During his studies, he continued to photograph and sell images to help finance his education. He left university without graduating.

=== Photojournalist ===
Developing his passion for photography, Hoepker won two prizes in the 'Young Photographer' category at the Photokina trade fair in Cologne. From 1959 to 1963 he worked as a photographer for Münchner Illustrierte and Kristall, reporting from around the world. For Kristall, he embarked on his first road trip crossing the United States in 1963 for three months. He worked on assignments around the globe with a desire to photograph human conditions. In 1964 he began working as a photojournalist for Stern. He made a series of photographs of boxer Muhammad Ali in 1966, prior to Ali's fight against Brian London at the Earl's Court Exhibition Centre, and later photographing him in Chicago, choosing two images to print which became iconic. He explained later: "... It has scratches, it's totally underexposed. It's practically a picture you wouldn't even take. You'd throw it away, but I saw the two together – a very brave and fantastic guy, and the guy with dark scratches, so I printed this also. These two pictures are a pair. You see the glory and the suffering, scratched, beaten black man. Very different."

In 1967, Hoepker travelled to Bihar, India, reporting on famine, flooding and a smallpox epidemic there. In 1973, his two documentaries on the famine in Ethiopia, along with his photography, sparked a huge aid project in Germany.

He lived and collaborated with his second wife, journalist Eva Windmöller, in East Berlin from 1974. In the 1970s he also worked as a cameraman for German TV, making documentary films. In 1976 he and his wife relocated to New York City as correspondents for Stern. From 1978 to 1981 he was director of photography for the American magazine Geo. From 1987 to 1989 Hoepker was based in Hamburg, working as art director for Stern.

In 2001, Hoepker took a photograph of people in Brooklyn with the 9/11 World Trade Center destruction in the background, View from Williamsburg, Brooklyn, on Manhattan, 9/11. He did not publish it then but in 2006 agreed to it being published in a book about photography of the event. The image proved still controversial. Frank Rich wrote in The New York Times: "Mr. Hoepker's photo is prescient as well as important—a snapshot of history soon to come".

=== Magnum Photos, cameras ===
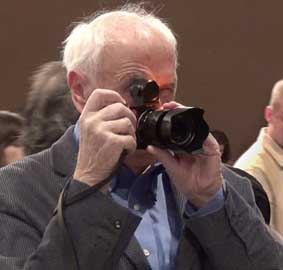
Hoepker with camera, 2014

Magnum Photos began distributing Hoepker's photographs in 1964. He became a full member in 1989 – the first German to do so – and served as president from 2003 to 2006.

For much of his career Hoepker used Leica cameras. In the 1970s he began to also use single-lens reflex cameras alongside his Leica, using Leicas for wide angle shots and Nikon or Canon cameras with zoom lenses. In 2002 he began using digital SLRs.

=== Personal life ===
Hoepker was married three times – to Vilma Treue, Eva Windmöller, and Christine Kruchen – and divorced twice. He had a son, Fabian, with his first wife.

He became an American citizen in July 2009, whilst maintaining his German citizenship.

Hoepker lived in New York City with his third wife, with whom he produced TV documentaries. In 2017, he was diagnosed with Alzheimer's disease. The couple then went on a road trip recalling his first one decades earlier; the trip was documented in a film, Dear Memories, released in 2022.

Hoepker died from complications of Alzheimer's in Santiago, Chile, on 10 July 2024, at the age of 88.

The president of Magnum, Cristina de Middel, wrote:

A true visionary, Thomas's contributions extended beyond his remarkable, playful, poignant photographs. As President of Magnum Photos from 2003 to 2006, he led with unwavering dedication and a commitment to nurturing the next generation of photographers and securing the future of the agency as a relevant entity. His legacy within the Magnum community is one of inspiration, mentorship, and a relentless pursuit of excellence combined with kindness and generosity. Thomas Hoepker's work will continue to inspire and educate, reminding us of the power of photography to shape our understanding of the world.

== Publications ==
Books by Hoepker are held by the German National Library, including:

- Jugend in dieser Zeit, Steingrüben, Germany, 1957
- Finnland, Terra Magica, Germany, 1960
- Lebendiges Kiel, Presseamt der Stadt Kiel, Germany, 1963
- Yatun papa. Father of the Indians. Dr. Theodor Binder, Kosmos, Germany, 1963
- Horst Janssen, artist's portraits, Galerie Brockstedt, Germany, 1967
- Die Iren und ihre Lieder, (The Irish and Their Songs), Germany, 1974
- Berliner Wände, C. Hanser, Germany, 1976
- Heinz Mack, Expedition in künstliche Gärten. Art in Desert and Ice, Sternbuch, Germany, 1977
- Vienna, Time/Life books, Holland, 1978
- Thomas Höpker (I Grandi Fotografi), Rizzoli, Italy, 1983
- Die New York-Story, GEO Buch, Germany, 1983
- Now! Überdosis New York/ HA Schult., Germany, 1984
- Der Wahn vom Weltreich: Germany's Former Colonies, Sternbuch, Germany, 1984
- Ansichten.Fotos von 1960 bis 1985, Braus, Heidelberg, Germany, 1985
- Leben in der DDR. Life in East Germany, Sternbuch, Germany, 1985
- Amerika: History of the Discovery from Florida to Canada, Germany, 1986
- HA Schult, New York ist Berlin, Germany, 1986
- New Yorker: 50 Unusual Portraits, Stemmle, Schaffhausen, Germany, 1987
- Rome, Hofmann & Campe, Germany, 1988
- HA Schult, Fetisch Auto, Germany, 1989
- Land of Enchantment, New Mexico, Philip-Morris books, Germany, 1991
- Return of the Maya: Guatemala. A Tale of Survival, Henry Holt, USA, 1998. ISBN 978-1-899235-81-0
- Thomas Hoepker, Photographien 1955–2005, Schirmer & Mosel, Germany, 2005. ISBN 978-3-8296-0219-8
- Champ, Berlin: Peperoni, 2012. ISBN 978-3941825338
- Thomas Hoepker, New York, teNeues, Germany, 2013. ISBN 978-3-8327-9712-6
- Heartland. Berlin: Peperoni, 2013. ISBN 9783941825451
- Wanderlust teNeues; Multilingual edition, 2014. ISBN 978-3832798529
- Big Champ. Berlin: Peperoni, 2015.

== Films ==
- Das Dorf Arabati (The Village Arabati, Ethiopia, 1973)
- Tod im Maisfeld (Death in a Cornfield, Guatemala, dir. Kruchen, Höpker), produced for Arte, broadcast on 10 August 1998, Medienpreis Entwicklungspolitik 1999
- Die Insel Robinson Crusoe (Robinson Crusoe Island, 2000)
- Die Osterinsel (Easter Island, 2003)
- Eiskalte Pracht – auf Patagoniens gefährdeten Gletschern (Ice-cold Splendor, Patagonia, dir. Kruchen, Höpker, 2005)

== Documentaries ==
- Augenzeugen: Thomas Höpker, Robert Lebeck, Stefan Moses, script and dir.: Thomas Schadt, for BR and Arte, 1998 Grimme-Preis
- Dear Memories – Eine Reise mit dem Magnum-Fotografen Thomas Hoepker by Nahuel Lopez, 2022 (trailer)

== Awards ==
- 1967: 3rd Place Award for Photo Stories, World Press Photo, Amsterdam
- 1968: Kulturpreis of the Deutsche Gesellschaft für Photographie
- 1999: Deutscher Medienpreis Entwicklungspolitik
- 1977: 1st Place Award for Art and Sciences, World Press Photo, Amsterdam
- 2014: Leica Hall of Fame Induction, Leica Awards

== Exhibitions ==
- Kunst und Gewerbe Museum, Hamburg, Germany, 1965
- Rizzoli Gallery, New York and Rizzoli Gallery, Washington, D.C., 1976
- Retrospective, 25 cities in Germany, 1985–1987
- The Maya Kunsthalle Cologne, Cologne, Germany, 1994
- Retrospective, Claus Tebbe Gallery, Cologne, Germany, 1995
- Photographien 1955–2005, Photomuseum, Munich, Germany, 2006
- Heartland, Leica Gallery Prague, Prague, Germany, 2014
- Ali and Beyond, Bildhalle Museum, Zürich, Switzerland, 2015-2016
- Thomas Hoepker - DEAR MEMORIES, Bildhalle Museum, Zürich, Switzerland, 2022
