= Bernhard Siegert =

German media theorist and historian

Bernhard Siegert (born 1959) is a German media theorist and media historian.

Siegert was born in Bremen. He graduated in 1987 in Germanic Studies, Philosophy and History at the Albert-Ludwigs-Universität Freiburg/Germany. He followed Friedrich Kittler, with whom he had worked already in Freiburg, to the department of Germanic studies at the Ruhr University Bochum, where he received his doctorate in 1991. In 2001 he earned a Habilitation at the Humboldt University Berlin. In the same year he was appointed to the chair for Theory and History of Cultural Techniques at the department for Media Studies at the Bauhaus University Weimar. Together with Friedrich Kittler, Norbert Bolz, and Wolfgang Coy he is regarded as a pioneer of German media theory. Since 2008 Siegert is one of the directors (together with Lorenz Engell) of the International Research Institute for Cultural Technologies and Media Philosophy (IKKM) in Weimar.

== Publications ==
- Final Frontiers: Eine Medienarchäologie des Meeres. Ferdinand Schöningh, Brill / Fink, Paderborn, 2024; München 2024, ISBN 978-3-8467-6899-0.
- Passagiere und Papiere. Fink, Paderborn; München 2006, ISBN 978-3-7705-4224-6.
- [...] Auslassungspunkte. Inst. für Buchkunst, Leipzig 2003, ISBN 3-932865-26-X.
- Passage des Digitalen. Brinkmann und Bose, Berlin 2003, ISBN 3-922660-80-0.
- Relays. Stanford Univ. Press, Stanford, Calif. 1999, ISBN 0-8047-3238-8.
- Relais. Brinkmann und Bose, Berlin 1993, ISBN 3-922660-52-5.
