= Hans Kauffmann =

German art historian (1896–1983)

Hans Kauffmann (March 30, 1896 in Kiel - March 15, 1983 in Bonn) was a German art historian.

== Life and work ==
The son of a professor of German philology in Kiel, Kauffmann studied art history at the universities of Munich, Berlin and Kiel, where he obtained his doctorate in 1919 with a thesis on Rembrandt's art. In 1922, he completed his Habilitationsschrift on Albrecht Dürer under Adolph Goldschmidt at the University of Berlin.

For some time, Kauffmann worked at the Gemäldegalerie Berlin under Wilhelm von Bode and in the print room at The Hague, where he was an assistant of Cornelis Hofstede de Groot. In 1924 he worked at the German Kunsthistorisches Institut in Florenz. From 1936 to 1956, he was professor and chair of art history at the University of Cologne. In 1957, he moved to the Free University of Berlin, where he was appointed the first professor of art history after World War II. He retired in 1964.

In 1964, Kauffmann did some research at the Institute for Advanced Study in Princeton, New Jersey, and in 1966 he was honorary professor at Harvard University, Cambridge, Massachusetts. He was also a Fellow of the Royal Society of Arts, London. He spent his last years in Bonn.

Apart from the books he wrote, he published many art historical essays in prestigious German art journals, mainly on masterpieces of art.

Among others, Günther Binding and Martin Warnke were his students. His son Georg Kauffmann was also an art historian.

== Select publications ==
- Rembrandts Bildgestaltung: Ein Beitrag zur Analyse seines Stils. Stuttgart 1922.
- Albrecht Dürers rhythmische Kunst. Leipzig 1924.
- Donatello: Eine Einführung in sein Bilden und Denken. Berlin 1935. 2nd edition, Berlin 1953.
- Ausstrahlungen der Universität auf die Kölner Kunst. Cologne 1938.
- Tilman Riemenschneider. Cologne 1943.
- "Die Fünfsinne in der niederländischen Malerei des 17. Jahrhunderts". In Hans Tintelnot, ed., Kunstgeschichtliche Studien. Breslau 1943, pp. 133–157.
- Albrecht Dürer als denkender Künstler. Bonn 1944.
- Lebendiges Museum. Düsseldorf 1952.
- Italienische Frührenaissance. Cologne 1956.
- Zweckbau und Monument: Zu Friedrich Schinkels Museum am Berliner Lustgarten. Frankfurt am Main 1963.
- Firenze nell'interpretazione tedesca : Discorso pronunziato in occasione della XIII Giornata Internazionale, Palazzo Vecchio, Florence 1964.
- Giovanni Lorenzo Bernini: Die figürliche Kompositionen. Berlin 1970.
- Peter Paul Rubens: Bildgedanke und künstlerische Form: Aufsätze und Reden. Berlin 1976.
- Probleme griechischer Säulen. Opladen 1976.
- "Albrecht Dürer um 1500". In Studies in Late Medieval and Renaissance Painting in Honor of Millard Meiss. New York 1977, pp. 261–273.

== See also ==
- Cornelis Hofstede de Groot
