= Aby Warburg =

German art historian (1866–1929)

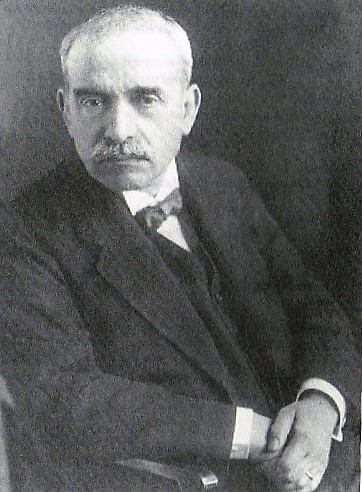
- Aby Warburg around 1925
- Born: Aby Moritz Warburg; June 13, 1866; Hamburg, North German Confederation
- Died: October 26, 1929 (aged 63); Hamburg, Germany
- Occupation: Art historian
- Spouse: Mary Hertz (m. 1897)
- Children: 3

Aby Moritz Warburg (June 13, 1866 – October 26, 1929) was a German art historian and cultural theorist who founded the Kulturwissenschaftliche Bibliothek Warburg (Warburg Library for Cultural Studies), a private library, which was later moved to the Warburg Institute, London. At the heart of his research was the legacy of the classical world, and the transmission of classical representation, in the most varied areas of Western culture through to the Renaissance.

Warburg described himself as: "Amburghese di cuore, ebreo di sangue, d'anima Fiorentino" ('Hamburger at heart, Jew by blood, Florentine in spirit').

== Early life and education ==
Aby Warburg was born in Hamburg into the wealthy Warburg family of German Jewish bankers. His ancestors had come to Germany from Italy in the 17th century and settled in the town of Warburg in Westphalia, taking on the town's name as their family name. In the 18th century the Warburgs moved to Altona near Hamburg.

Two brothers Warburg founded the banking firm M. M. Warburg & Co in Hamburg, which today again has an office there. Aby Warburg was the first of seven children born to Moritz Warburg, director of the Hamburg bank, and his wife Charlotte, née Oppenheim. Aby Warburg showed an early interest in literature and history. The second eldest son, Max Warburg, went into the Hamburg bank, and younger brothers Paul and Felix also entered banking. Max Warburg established the Warburg family bank as a global player.

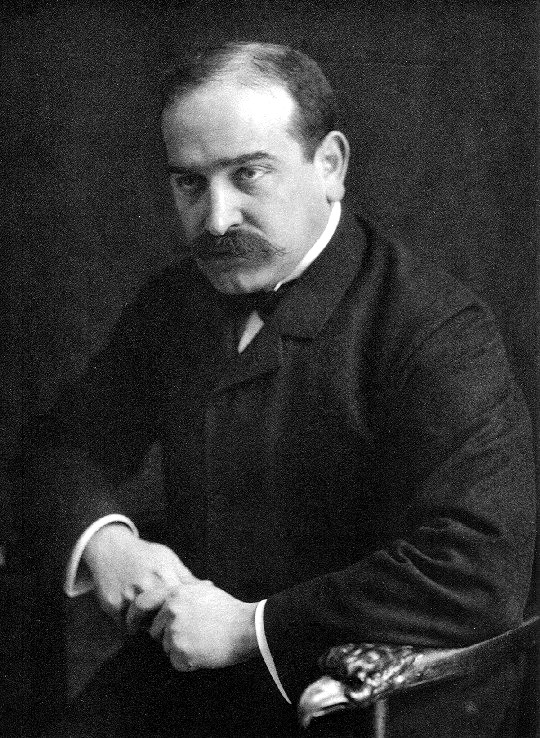
Max Warburg

Warburg grew up in a conservative Jewish home environment. Early on he demonstrated an unstable, unpredictable and volatile temperament. Warburg as a child reacted against the religious rituals which were punctiliously observed in his family, and rejected all career plans envisaged for him. He did not want to be a rabbi, as his grandmother wished, nor a doctor or lawyer.

Despite resistance from his relatives, Warburg persisted in his plans to study art history. He made a deal with his brother Max to forfeit his right, as the eldest son, to take over the family firm, in return for an undertaking on Max's part to provide him with all the books he ever needed.

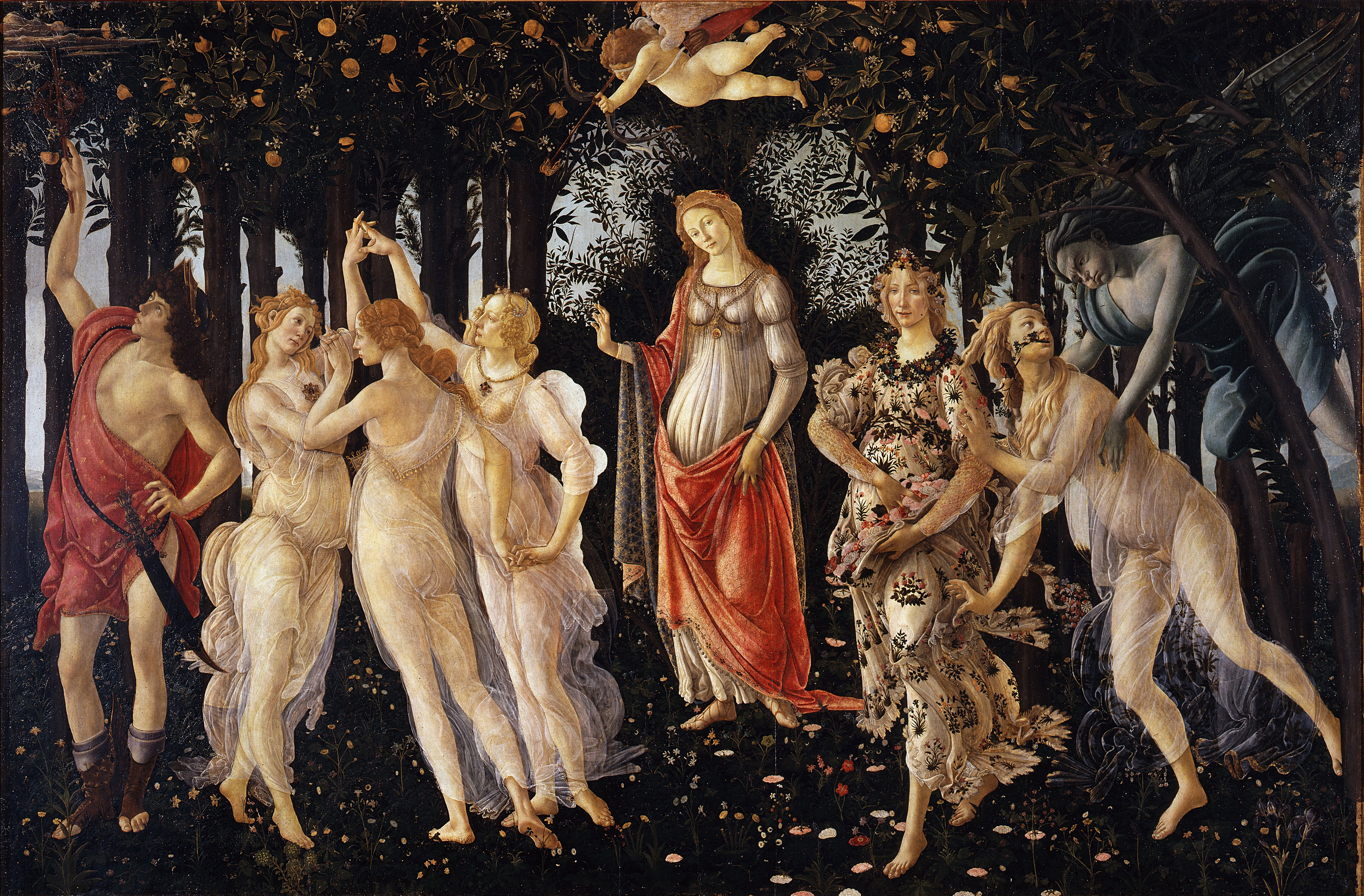
Primavera

In 1886 Warburg began his study of art history, history and archaeology in Bonn and attended the lectures on the history of religion by Hermann Usener, those on cultural history by Karl Lamprecht and on art history by Carl Justi. He continued his studies in Munich and with Hubert Janitschek in Strasbourg, completing under him his dissertation on Botticelli's paintings The Birth of Venus and Primavera.

From 1888 to 1889 he studied the sources of these pictures at the Kunsthistorisches Institut in Florence. He was now interested in applying the methods of natural science to the human sciences. His dissertation was completed in 1892 and printed in 1893. Warburg's study introduced into art history a new method, that of iconography or iconology, later developed by Erwin Panofsky. After receiving his doctorate Warburg studied for two semesters at the Medical Faculty of the University of Berlin, where he attended lectures on psychology. During this period he undertook a further trip to Florence.

== Travels in the United States ==
In 1895, Warburg's brother Paul Warburg married Nina Loeb (daughter of Solomon Loeb) in New York City, marking the beginning of Aby Warburg's travels in the southwestern United States. Before heading West, he had met veteran anthropologists James Mooney and Frank Hamilton Cushing at the Smithsonian Institution, both of whom contributed to early ethnographies of Indigenous Americans.

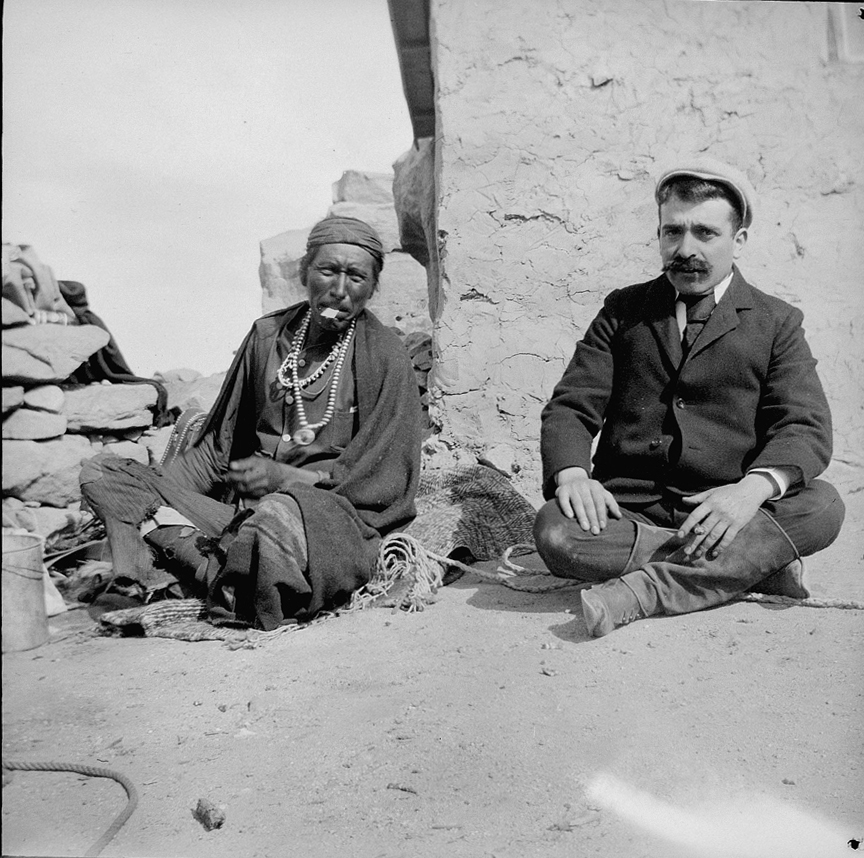
Aby Warburg 1896

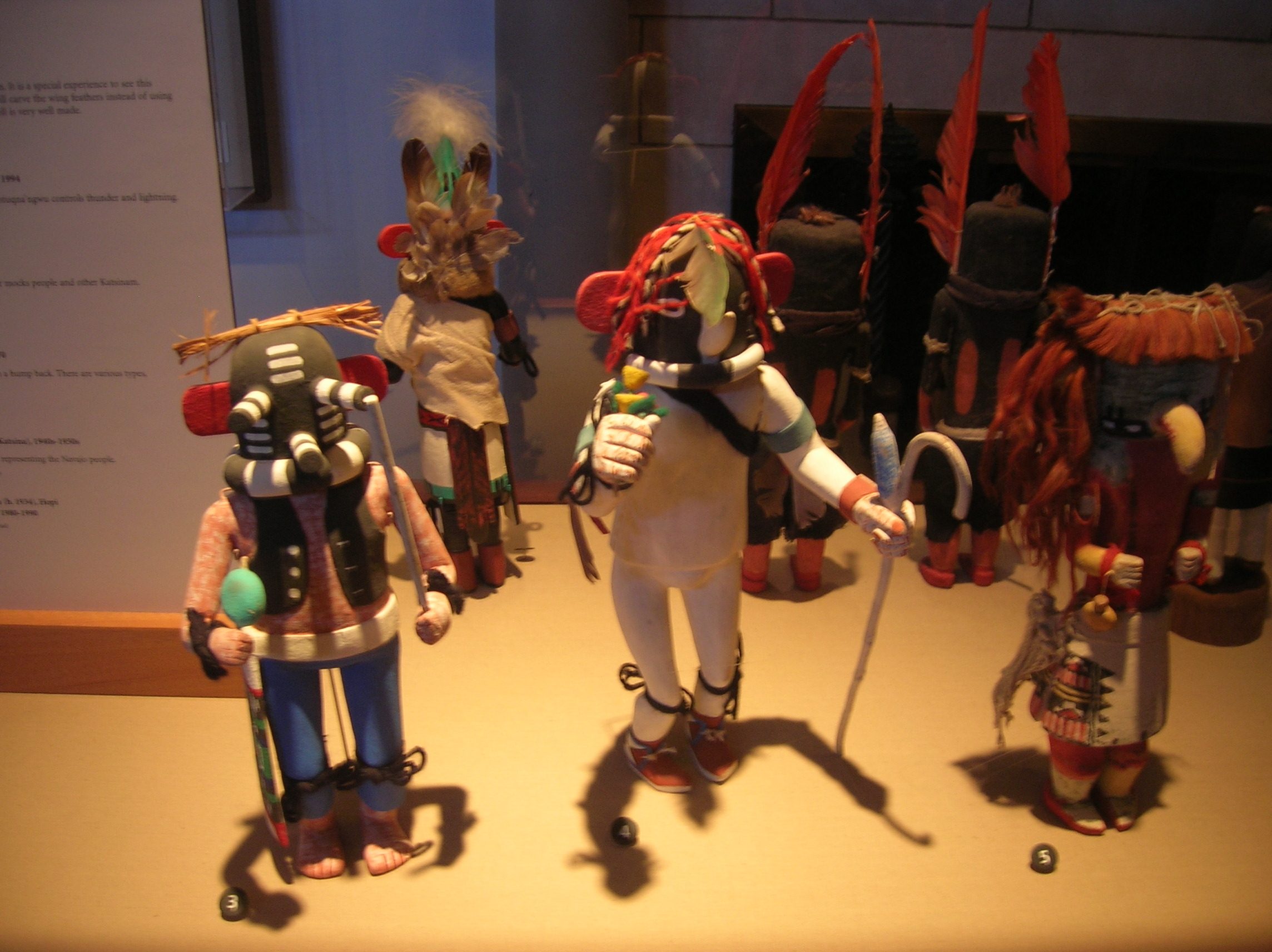
Kachina doll of the Hopi

Warburg's first stop in his travels was Mesa Verde to see the Ancestral Pueblo cliff dwellings. He continued on to visit a number of Pueblo villages in New Mexico before stopping in San Ildefonso, where he had the opportunity to photograph a traditional Antelope dance. In Cochiti, Warburg convinced a priest and his son to illustrate their culture's cosmology; their drawing highlighted the importance of meteorological phenomena and serpents to their cultural worldview. Warburg's interest in Hopi snake imagery was also apparent through his interest in the snake dance of the Arizona Hopi. He had first heard of this tradition through discussions with Mooney, and although he never witnessed the dance firsthand it remained influential to his writings about the Hopi. In general, the Hopi culture represented a recurring object of Warburg's fascination: their architecture, rituals, masks, symbolism, and the ancient tradition of pottery painting (a tradition that was undergoing a revival, partly thanks to Nampeyo). Some of Warburg's observations of the Hopi people were informed by the Mennonite missionary, evangelist and ethnographer Heinrich R. Voth. Voth shared Warburg's interest in Hopi religion and culture and provided Warburg with details about the famous Hopi snake dance, as well as introducing him to Hopi people and giving him access to sacred Hopi ceremonies and photographic opportunities. In Oraibi, the last stop in southwestern voyage, Warburg attended and diligently recorded his experience at Kachina dances.

Warburg's American travels served as the inspiration for his first forays into photography and ethnography, but aside from two photographic exhibits, his personal accounts of his experiences among the Pueblo and Hopi peoples remained largely unexamined for nearly three decades. He ended up reviving his travel notes for his 1923 lecture on the Hopi snake dance ritual. In it, he stressed the kinship of religious thinking in Athens and Oraibi. The lecture also became the grounds by which Warburg was released from his psychiatric treatment at the Bellevue Sanitorium.

== Florence ==
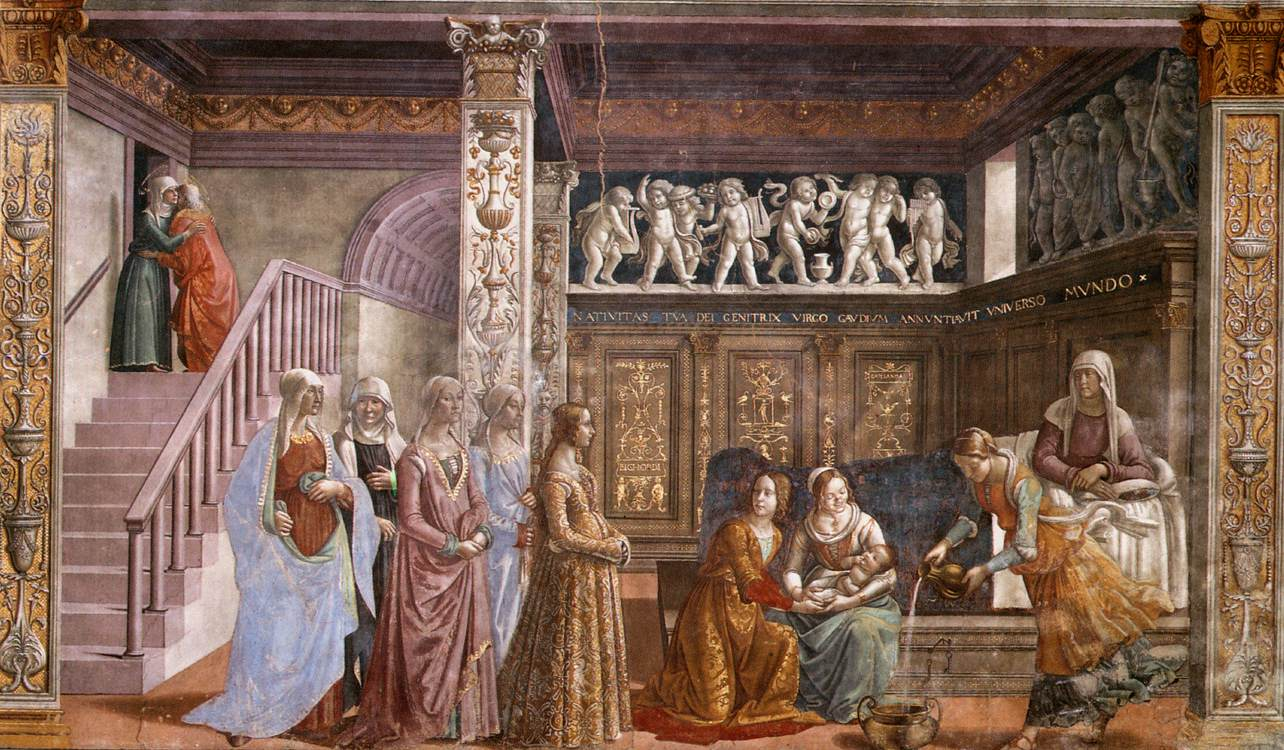
Birth of St Mary in Santa Maria Novella in Firenze by Domenico Ghirlandaio

In 1897 Warburg married, against his father's will, the painter and sculptor Mary Hertz, daughter of Adolph Ferdinand Hertz, a Hamburg senator and member of the Synod of the Evangelical-Lutheran Church in Hamburg, and Maria Gossler, both members of the traditional Hanseatic elite of Hamburg. The couple had three children: Marietta (1899–1973), Max Adolph (1902–1974) and Frede C. Warburg (1904–2004). In 1898 Warburg and his wife took up residence in Florence. While Warburg was repeatedly plagued by depression, the couple enjoyed a lively social life. Among their Florentine circle could be counted the sculptor Adolf von Hildebrand, the writer Isolde Kurz, the English architect and antiquary Herbert Horne, the Dutch Germanist André Jolles and his wife Mathilde Wolff-Mönckeberg, and the Belgian art historian Jacques Mesnil.

During his years in Florence Warburg investigated the living conditions and business transactions of Renaissance artists and their patrons as well as, more specifically, the economic situation in the Florence of the early Renaissance and the problems of the transition from the Middle Ages to the early Renaissance. A further product of his Florentine period was his series of lectures on Leonardo da Vinci, held in 1899 at the Kunsthalle Hamburg. In his lectures he discussed Leonardo's study of medieval bestiaries as well as his engagement with the classical theory of proportion of Vitruvius. He also occupied himself with Botticelli's engagement with the Ancients, evident in the representation of the clothing of figures. Feminine clothing takes on a symbolic meaning in Warburg's famous essay, inspired by discussions with Jolles, on the nymphs and the figure of the Virgin in Domenico Ghirlandaio's fresco in Santa Maria Novella in Florence. The contrast evident in the painting between the constricting dress of the matrons and the lightly dressed, quick-footed figure on the far right serves as an illustration of the virulent discussion around 1900 concerning the liberation of female clothing from the standards of propriety imposed by a reactionary bourgeoisie.

== Return to Hamburg ==
In 1902 the family returned to Hamburg, and Warburg presented the findings of his Florentine research in a series of lectures, but at first did not take on a professorship or any other academic position. He rejected a call to a professorship at the University of Halle in 1912. He became a member of the board of the Völkerkundemuseum, with his brother Max sponsored the foundation of the "Hamburger wissenschaftlichen Stiftung" (1907) and the foundation of a university in Hamburg, which succeeded in 1919, and at which he took up a professorship. At this period signs of a mental illness were present which affected his activities as a researcher and teacher.

He had manic depression and symptoms of schizophrenia, and was hospitalized in Ludwig Binswanger's neurological clinic in Kreuzlingen, Switzerland in 1921. There he was visited by Emil Kraepelin who did not confirm the diagnosis of schizophrenia and suggested Warburg was in a mixed manic-depressive state, a diagnosis with a more positive prognosis. Indeed, his mental conditions improved also thanks to the support of the philosopher Ernst Cassirer, who visited him in the clinic: "Warburg was highly relieved that Cassirer fully understood his plans to restart his research, that Cassirer highlighted the importance of Warburg's ongoing scientific efforts, and felt he could contribute substantively to the art history discourse" After his release from Binswanger's clinic in 1924, Warburg held occasional lectures and seminars between 1925 and 1929, which took place in a private circle or in his library.

== Last project: Mnemosyne Atlas ==
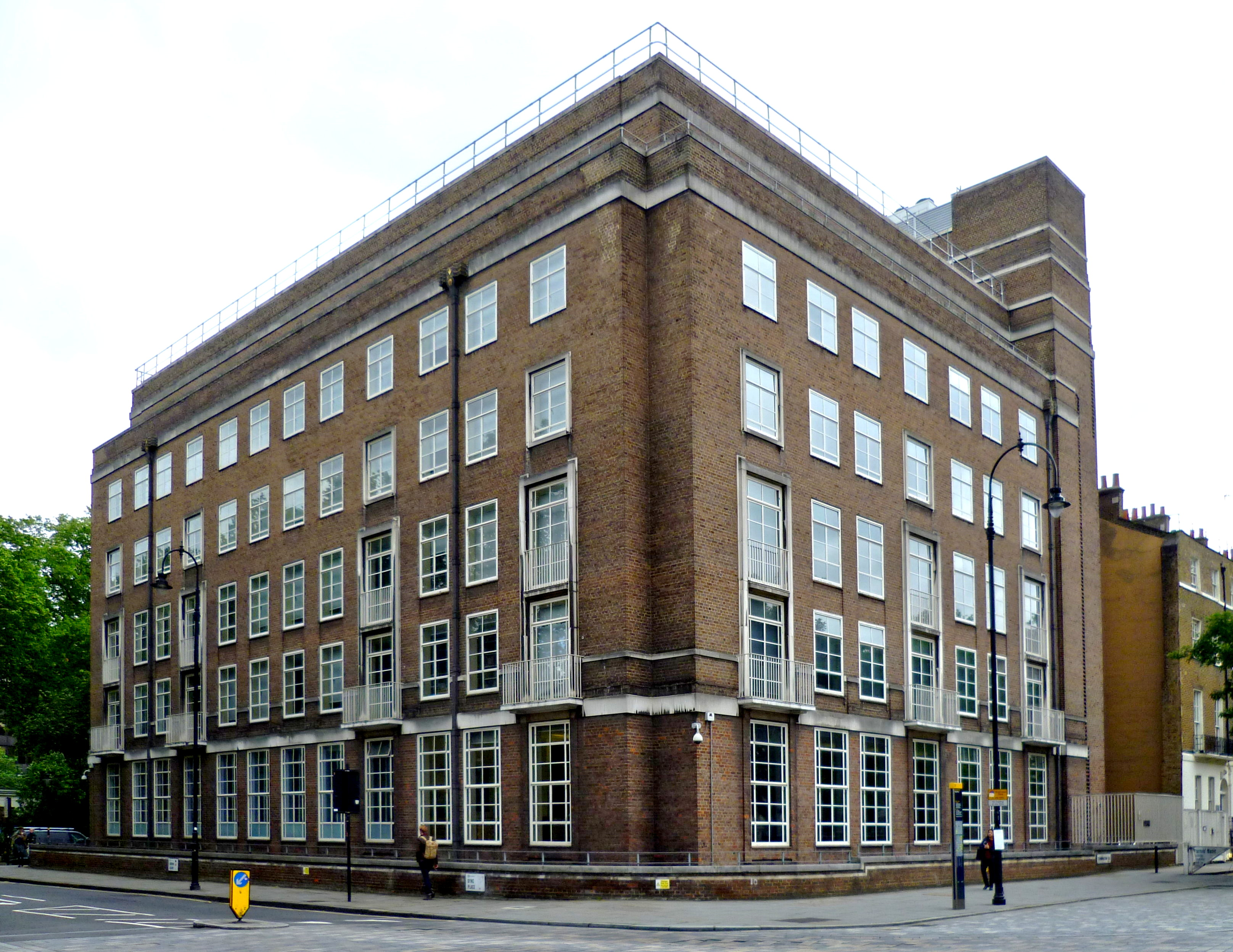
The Warburg Institute

In December 1927, Warburg started to compose a work in the form of a picture atlas named Mnemosyne. It consisted of 40 wooden panels covered with black cloth, on which were pinned nearly 1,000 pictures from books, magazines, newspapers and other daily life sources. These pictures were arranged according to different themes:

1. Coordinates of memory
2. Astrology and mythology
3. Archaeological models
4. Migrations of the ancient gods
5. Vehicles of tradition
6. Irruption of antiquity
7. Dionysiac formulae of emotions
8. Nike and Fortuna
9. From the Muses to Manet
10. Dürer: the gods go North
11. The age of Neptune
12. "Art officiel" and the baroque
13. Re-emergence of antiquity
14. The classical tradition today

There were no captions and only a few texts in the atlas. "Warburg certainly hoped that the beholder would respond with the same intensity to the images of passion or of suffering, of mental confusion or of serenity, as he had done in his work."

Warburg died in Hamburg of a heart attack on 26 October 1929 with his Mnemosyne Atlas unfinished.

== Status in the history of science ==
Aby Warburg is considered one of the major benefactors of the humanities during the turn of the 20th century. Despite being respected among academics during his lifetime, he remained widely unknown and was almost forgotten during Nazi rule and the years following World War II. The adoption of his work was hindered by the fact that only a few of his texts were even published; some only existed as revised editions or were only printed partially in German. For the most part, his academic estate consists of notes, card indices, about 35,000 letters, incomplete manuscripts, as well as a library diary written from 1926 to 1929. In 1933 it was decided to relocate the entire library and staff to London, a move in which Warburg's mentee Edgar Wind was instrumental; the young discipline of art history was thereby introduced into the Anglo-Saxon world and led to the establishing of chairs at several elite universities.

New interest in Warburg was sparked by the publication of Ernst Gombrich's biography, which was published in England in 1970 and only printed in a German translation eleven years later. However, this publication has been criticized for its incompleteness and supposed subjectiveness. Martin Warnke and the Warburg Institute in London have also played a major role in curating Warburg's estate since the 1970s.

Warburg introduced Iconology as an additional research method besides the then prevalent Formalism. A considerable number of words and phrases coined by him have found their way into the vocabulary of present-day art history, such as Denkraum or Pathosformel, sometimes in a way Warburg did not intend. His famous quote “God is in the details” (cf. "The devil is in the details") refers to the extensive study of various documents in order to achieve a profound understanding of an artwork in relation to its historical and social context. This method is commonly attributed to the works of the so-called "Warburg School".

Research into the Italian and German Renaissance was heavily influenced by Warburg and his Kulturwissenschaftliche Bibliothek. Research into Warburg was sparked once again in the course of the Iconic turn. Considering its claims to an interdisciplinary approach towards the world of images, drawing on methods from philosophy, theology, ethnology, art history, media studies, cognitive sciences, psychology, and the natural sciences, as well as the utilization and analysis of visual documents of all kinds, some scholars see Warburg as a precursor to this school of thought.

== Publications ==
- Das Schlangenritual. Ein Reisebericht. Mit einem Nachwort von Ulrich Raulff. Berlin 1988.
- Gesammelte Schriften (Studienausgabe), Berlin: Akademie-Verlag (since 2015 De Gruyter):
- Vol. I.1,2: Die Erneuerung der heidnischen Antike. Beiträge zur Geschichte der europäischen Literatur. Edited by Horst Bredekamp and Michael Diers, 2 Vol. [reprint of the first edition 1932]. Berlin 1998.
- Vol. II.1: Der Bilderatlas MNEMOSYNE. Ed. by Martin Warnke and Claudia Brink. Berlin 2000.
- Vol. II.2: Bilderreihen und Ausstellungen. Ed. by Uwe Fleckner and Isabella Woldt. Berlin 2012.
- Vol. III.2: Bilder aus dem Gebiet der Pueblo-Indianer in Nord-Amerika. Ed. by Uwe Fleckner. Berlin 2018.
- Vol. IV: Fragmente zur Ausdruckskunde. Ed. by Ulrich Pfisterer and Hans Christian Hoenes. Berlin 2015.
- Vol. V: Briefe. Ed. by Michael Diers and Steffen Haug with Thomas Helbig. Berlin 2021.
- Vol. VII: Tagebuch der Kulturwissenschaftlichen Bibliothek Warburg. Ed. by Karen Michels and Charlotte Schoell-Glass. Berlin 2001.

== See also ==
- Aby Warburg Prize
- Jean Seznec
- Warburg Haus, Hamburg
