= Michael Diers =

German Professor and Art Historian

Michael Diers (born 15 March 1950, in Werl, West Germany) is a German art historian and professor of art history in Hamburg and Berlin.

Diers studied art history, literature, and philosophy in Münster and Hamburg, where he received his doctorate with a thesis on Aby Warburg. He also received his postdoctoral lecture qualification in 1994. From 1990 to 1992 he was assistant professor at the Kulturwissenschaftliches Institut, Essen, and subsequently at the Department of Art History, Universität Hamburg, in the joint research project "Politische Ikonographie". In 1994 he became lecturer at the Universität Jena, in 1999 at the Humboldt-Universität zu Berlin, where he also served as Director of the Department of Art History (2000–2002).

In 2004, Diers was appointed professor of art history and visual studies at the Hochschule für bildende Künste Hamburg, where he retired in 2017. In the same time, he was also adjunct professor of art history at the Humboldt-Universität zu Berlin. His fellowships include the IKKM (Weimar), the Deutsches Forum für Kunstgeschichte (Paris), the Bard College Center (New York), the Deutsches Studienzentrum (Venice), and the Getty Research Institute (Los Angeles, 2017/18). Apart from his academic affiliations, Diers has also worked extensively as a free-lance art critic and curator. In his teaching practice and in his art historical research, Diers follows a motto he first encountered in a neon sculpture by Maurizio Nannucci: "All art has been contemporary".

Diers' research interests are the art of the Renaissance and modern and contemporary art (photography, film, new media), focusing on political iconography, intellectual history, picture theory, and media theories. In 1991 Diers became first editor, and subsequently chief editor, of the renowned pocketbook series "Kunststück" (Fischer Verlag, Frankfurt, 1991–2001, 102 vols). From 2005 to 2007 he edited the series "FUNDUS" (Philo Fine Arts, Hamburg). He currently serves as co-editor of the "Studienausgabe Aby Warburg, Gesammelte Schriften" (De Gruyter, since 1998) and from 2004 to 2016 the monograph series "Humboldt-Schriften zur Kunst- und Bildgeschichte" (Gebr. Mann Verlag, Berlin).

Diers is a regular contributor to the Frankfurter Allgemeine Zeitung, to the Süddeutsche Zeitung, to the Neue Zürcher Zeitung, Die Zeit and Tageszeitung.

== Books ==
- Warburg aus Briefen. Kommentare zu den Kopierbüchern der Jahre 1905–1918, Weinheim 1991
- Schlagbilder. Zur politischen Ikonographie der Gegenwart, Frankfurt/M. 1997
- Fotografie Film Video. Beiträge zu einer kritischen Theorie des Bildes, Hamburg 2006
- Vor aller Augen. Studien zu Kunst, Bild und Politik, Paderborn 2016
- Mary Warburg. Leben – Werk. Porträt einer Künstlerin, Munich 2020 (with Bärbel Hedinger)
- Gegen den Strich. Die Kunst und ihre politischen Formen, Berlin 2023

=== As editor ===
- Aby Warburg. Akten des internationalen Symposiums Hamburg 1990, Weinheim 1991 (with Horst Bredekamp and Charlotte Schoell-Glass)
- Porträt aus Büchern. Bibliothek Warburg & Warburg Institute, Hamburg - 1933 - London, Hamburg 1993
- Mo(nu)mente. Formen und Funktionen ephemerer Denkmäler, Weinheim 1995
- Martin Warnke, Nah und fern zum Bilde. Beiträge zu Kunst und Kunsttheorie, Köln 1997
- Aby Warburg, Gesammelte Schriften. Studienausgabe, Bd. I,1.2 (= Reprint of the original edition Leipzig/Berlin 1932), new edition with a foreword (with Horst Bredekamp), Berlin 1998
- "Der Bevölkerung". Aufsätze und Dokumente zur Debatte um das Reichstagsprojekt von Hans Haacke, Köln 2000 (with Kasper König)
- Rudolf Arnheim, Stimme von der Galerie - 25 kleine Aufsätze zur Kultur der Zeit, Berlin 2004
- Topos RAUM. Die Aktualität des Raumes in den Künsten der Gegenwart, Berlin und Nürnberg 2005 (gemeinsam mit Robert Kudielka, Angela Lammert and Gerd Mattenklott)
- Dissimulazione onesta oder Die ehrliche Verstellung. Von der Weisheit der versteckten Beunruhigung in Wort, Bild und Tat. Martin Warnke zu Ehren. Ein Symposium, Hamburg 2007 (with Horst Bredekamp, Ruth Tesmar and Franz-Joachim Verspohl)
- Topos Atelier. Werkstatt und Wissensform. Berlin 2010 (with Monika Wagner)
- Das Interview. Formen und Foren des Künstlergesprächs, Hamburg 2013 (with Hans Ulrich Obrist and Lars Blunck)
- Max Liebermann: Die Kunstsammlung. Von Rembrandt bis Manet, Munich 2013 (with Bärbel Hedinger and Jürgen Müller)
- Focus on BLOW-UP. Die Gegenwart der Bilder bei Antonioni, Hamburg 2018 (with Denis Grünemeier and Beat Wyss)
- O Superman. Gedanken über Film, Kunst, Politik (und Lehre), Hamburg 2019
- Aby Warburg, Briefe (= Gesammelte Schriften. Studienausgabe, V.1–2), Berlin 2021 (with Steffen Haug and Thomas Helbig)

== Sources ==
- S. Haug, H.G. Hiller von Gaertringen, C. Philipp, S.M. Schultz, M. Ziegler u. T. Zürn (Hg.), Arbeit am Bild. Ein Album für Michael Diers. Köln, Verlag der Buchhandlung Walther König, Köln 2010
- Michael Diers, in: Kürschners Deutscher Gelehrten-Kalender. Biobliographisches Verzeichnis deutschsprachiger Wissenschaftler der Gegenwart. 22. Ausgabe, München 2009
- Michael Diers - Institut für Kunst- und Bildgeschichte - HU Berlin
- All biographical and academic informations are a translation of the German Wikipedia article on Michael Diers.
