= Rüdiger Campe =

German literary scholar

Rüdiger Campe (born 1953 in Hagen) is a German literary scholar of modern German literature whose research focuses on rhetoric, aesthetics, history of science, and literary history and theory. He is currently the Alfred C. and Martha F. Mohr Professor of German and Professor of Comparative Literature at Yale University. He is a recipient of the Humboldt Research Award and the Aby Warburg Prize.

== Life and career ==
From 1974 to 1984, Campe studied German language and literature, philosophy, and classical philology at the Ruhr University Bochum, the University of Freiburg and in Paris under Gerhard Kaiser and Friedrich Kittler. Campe's dissertation was titled "Affekt und Ausdruck. Zur Umwandlung der literarischen Rede im 17. Jahrhundert". He received his Ph.D. from Freiburg University in 1987 with a summa cum laude. Cample completed his habilitation in 2000 at the University of Essen.

Campe was an assistant professor at the University of Essen from 1986 to 1996. He joined the German department of Johns Hopkins University in 2001 and served as the department's chair for several years. Since 2007, Campe has been a German and Comparative Literature professor at Yale University. At Yale, he has served as the department chair and has been Alfred C. and Martha F. Mohr Professor of German Languages and Literatures since 2016.

Campe has been a visiting professor at New York University, the universities of Konstanz, Siegen and Viadrina (Frankfurt/Oder). He has served on several advisory boards, including Leibniz-Zentrum für Literatur- und Kulturforschung (ZfL) at Berlin, the Erich-Auerbach-Institute at Cologne and the Hans Blumenberg Society. Campe has held advisory board positions in journals, including the Monatshefte, the Bucknell Goethe series, Athenäum, and Studia Theodisca.

== Research ==
Campe's research explores the interconnections of literature, aesthetics, and science. In the Game of Probability: Literature and Calculation from Pascal and Kleist (2002, trans. 2012), he explores the humanities and mathematical sciences, particularly the science of probability and games, as part of an interrelated discourse and a continuing rhetorical tradition. According to Campe, literary-rhetorical traditions allowed a better understanding of probabilities, while probability theory revitalized literary traditions.

Other research interests include the history of rhetoric and poetics in aesthetics, theories of speech act, affect, and physiognomy. Campe developed the concept of "scene of writing" (Schreibszene), which has been influential in German literary and media theory. In literary history, Campe has dealt with reception studies, the Baroque theater, theories of the novel, and the intersection of literature and law. He has written on Moritz, Racine, Gryphius, Baumgarten, Goethe, Lichtenberg, Hölderlin, Kleist, Büchner, Kafka, Lukács, Walser and Musil.

== Awards ==
- Fellow, Center for Advanced Studies, Hamburg, Imaginaria of Force, 2022
- Fellow, Internationales Forschungszentrum Kulturwissenschaften, Vienna, 2016
- Fellow of the International Research Center for Cultural Studies, University of Art and Design Linz, 2016
- Humboldt Research Award of the Alexander von Humboldt Foundation, 2011
- Fellow of the Wissenschaftskolleg zu Berlin, 2008
- Aby Warburg Prize (Hamburg), 2002

== Selected works ==
=== Authored works ===
- Affekt und Ausdruck. Zur Umwandlung der literarischen Rede im 17. und 18. Jahrhundert (Tübingen: Niemeyer, 1990).
- The Game of Probability. Literature and Calculation from Pascal and Kleist, trans. Ellwood Wiggins, Jr. (Stanford University Press, 2012). Revised trans. of "Spiel der Wahrscheinlichkeit."
- Baumgarten-Studien. Zur Genealogie der Ästhetik, co-authored with A. Haverkamp, C. Menke (Berlin: August, 2014).
- Die Institution im Roman. Robert Musil (Würzburg: Königshausen & Neumann 2020).

=== Edited volumes ===
- Geschichten der Physiognomik. Text-Bild-Wissen, ed. Rüdiger Campe, Manfred Schneider (Freiburg: Rombach, 1996).
- Modern Language Notes, Special issue: Literature and Science, 118 (2003), ed. Rüdiger Campe.
- Gesetz. Ironie, ed. Rüdiger Campe, Michael Niehaus (Heidelberg: Synchron, 2004).
- Modern Language Notes, Special issue, dedicated to the memory of Bianca Theisen, 121 (2006), ed. Rüdiger Campe.
- Penthesileas Versprechen. Exemplarische Studien zur literarischen Referenz, ed. R. Campe (Freiburg: Rombach, 2008).
- Telos, Special Issue, Hans Blumenberg, ed. R. Campe, P. Fleming, K. Wetters, 158 (2012).
- Germanic Review, special issue "The Case of Citation," 2014, co-ed. with Arne Höcker.
- Rethinking Emotion. Interiority and Exteriority in Premodern, Modern, and Contemporary Thought, co-ed. with Julia Weber (Berlin, Boston: De Grutyer, 2014).
- Bella Parrhesia. Begriff und Figur der freien Rede in der frühen Neuzeit, co-ed. with Malte Wessels (Freiburg: Rombach, 2018).
- Screen Genealogies. From Optical Device to Environmental Medium, ed. Craig Buckley, Rüdiger Campe, Francesco Casetti (Amsterdam: Amsterdam University Press, 2019).
- For a New Aufklärung/Enlightenment, special issue in: Germanic Review 95 (2020), co- ed. with Hans Adler.
