= Joseph Vogl =

German philosopher (born 1957)

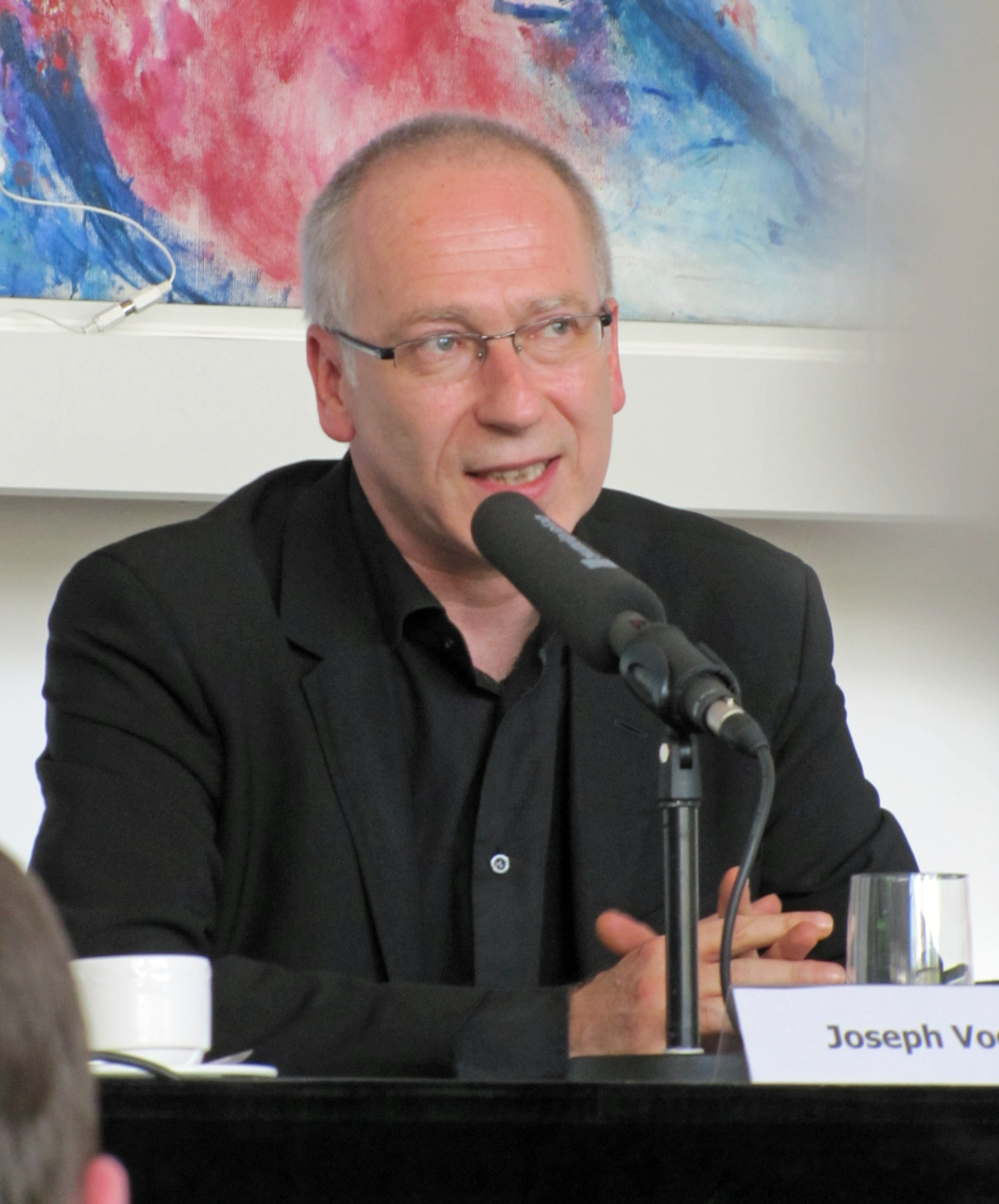
- Vogl in 2012.
- Born: Joseph Vogl; October 5, 1957 (age 69); Eggenfelden, Lower Bavaria, Germany
- Occupations: Philosopher, professor
- Years active: 1990-present

Joseph Vogl (born October 5, 1957) is a German philosopher who has written on literature, culture and media. He was professor of modern German literature, literary, media and cultural studies at the Humboldt University of Berlin.

== Life and work ==
After graduating from high school in 1977, Vogl studied German literature, philosophy and history in Munich and Paris. He completed his M.A. from LMU Munich in 1984, and he earned his doctorate in German literature in 1990. He was awarded a postdoctoral fellowship by the German Research Foundation (Deutsche Forschungsgemeinschaft) from 1992 to 1994 and a postdoctoral scholarship from 1995 to 1997. In 1999, Vogl became professor of history and theory of artificial worlds at the Faculty of Media of the Bauhaus University, Weimar

In 2001, he qualified as a professor in the subject German literature at the Faculty of Foreign Languages and Literatures of LMU Munich. Since April 1, 2006, he has held the chair of modern German literature: literary, media and cultural studies at the Humboldt University of Berlin.

He has also been visiting professor at Princeton University (2006–2007), at the University of California, Berkeley, (2007) and since 2007 he has been permanent visiting professor at the Department of German at Princeton University.

One research focus of Joseph Vogl is on the "Poetologies of knowledge" - the interweaving of knowledge and literature. Other priorities include the history and theory of knowledge, the history of risk and danger in the modern era, and the discourse, media theory and literary history from 18th to 20th century.

Vogl's work is in the tradition of the post-structuralist philosophy. He is the translator of key works of modern French philosophy such as Gilles Deleuze's Difference and Repetition and Jean-François Lyotard's The Differend.

In his 2010 published work Das Gespenst des Kapitals ("The Specter of Capital") Vogl coined the term "Oikodizee", calling for a demystification of traditional conception of financial markets. The powerful faith in the invisible hand of the market in the tradition of Adam Smith "ignores the secularised theodicy the irrational" and the "diabolical dynamics unleashed by money economy."

For his book Der Souveränitätseffekt ("The Sovereignty Effect") Vogl was on the shortlist for the Leipzig Book Fair Prize 2015 in the category of non-fiction.

== Works ==
Books in English

- The Ascendancy of Finance, John Wiley & Sons, 2017.
- The Specter of Capital. Stanford, Stanford University Press, 2014.
- On Tarrying. Chicago, University of Chicago Press, 2011.

Articles in English

- "The Real and the All-Too-Human" (trans. William Callison), Parrhesia: A Journal of Critical Philosophy (2015) No. 22: 16–21.
- "The Sovereignty Effect: Markets and Power in the Economic Regime" (trans. William Callison), Qui Parle (2014) 23(1): 125–155.
- "Poetics of Homo Economicus" (trans. Dennis Schep), Continent (2014) Issue 4.1: 95–104.
- "The Undoing of Functional Differentiation, October (Summer 2014) No. 149: 89–94.
- "Taming Time: Media of Financialization" (trans. Christopher Reid), Grey Room (2012) No. 46: 72–83.
- "Becoming-media: Galileo's Telescope" Grey Room (2007) No. 29: 14–25.

Books in German

- With Thomas Anz (Hrsg.): Die Dichter und der Krieg. Deutsche Lyrik 1914–1918. Hanser, München 1982. ISBN 3-446-13470-0.
- Orte der Gewalt. Kafkas literarische Ethik. (=Diss. München, 1990) Fink, München 1990. ISBN 3-7705-2653-8. Wiederveröffentlicht diaphanes, Zürich-Berlin 2010, ISBN 978-3-03734-100-1.
- (Ed.): Gemeinschaften. Positionen zu einer Philosophie des Politischen. Suhrkamp, Frankfurt am Main 1994. ISBN 3-518-11881-1.
- (Ed.): Kafka-Brevier. Reclam, Stuttgart 1995. ISBN 978-3-15-040024-1.
- With Friedrich Balke (Ed.): Gilles Deleuze. Fluchtlinien der Philosophie. Fink, München 1996. ISBN 3-7705-3097-7, TB Suhrkamp ISBN 978-3-518-11919-8.
- With Wolfgang Schäffner (Ed.): Michel Foucault/Herculine Barbin. Über Hermaphrodismus. Suhrkamp, Frankfurt am Main 1997. ISBN 978-3-518-11733-0.
- (Ed.): Poetologien des Wissens um 1800. Fink, München 1999. ISBN 978-3-770-53308-4.
- Claus Pias, Lorenz Engell u. a. (Ed.): Kursbuch MedienKultur. DVA, Stuttgart 2000. ISBN 978-3-421-05310-7.
- Kalkül und Leidenschaft. Poetik des ökonomischen Menschen. diaphanes, Zürich-Berlin 2002, ISBN 978-3-935300-46-9.
- With Bernhard Siegert (Ed.): Europa. Kultur der Sekretäre. diaphanes, Zürich-Berlin 2003, ISBN 978-3-935300-38-4.
- Gesetz und Urteil. Beiträge zu einer Theorie des Politischen. VDG, Weimar 2004. ISBN 978-3-8973-9344-8.
- With Anne von der Heiden (Ed.): Politische Zoologie. diaphanes, Zürich-Berlin 2007, ISBN 978-3-935300-94-0.
- Über das Zaudern. diaphanes, Zürich-Berlin 2007, ISBN 978-3-03734-020-2.
- Für alle und keinen. Lektüre, Schrift und Leben bei Nietzsche und Kafka. diaphanes, Zürich-Berlin 2008, ISBN 978-3-03734-039-4.
- With Sabine Schimma (Ed.): Versuchsanordnungen 1800. diaphanes, Zürich-Berlin 2008, ISBN 978-3-03734-028-8.
- With Alexander Kluge: Soll und Haben. Fernsehgespräche. diaphanes, Zürich-Berlin 2009, ISBN 978-3-03734-051-6.
- Das Gespenst des Kapitals. diaphanes, Zürich 2010, ISBN 978-3-03734-116-2.
- Der Souveränitätseffekt diaphanes, Zürich 2015, ISBN 978-3-03734-250-3.
- Kapital und Ressentiment. EINE KURZE THEORIE DER GEGENWART C.H.Beck, München 2021, ISBN 978-3-406-76953-5.

Books in Spanish

- El espectro del capital, Buenos Aires, Cruce Casa Editora, 2015, ISBN 978-987-45637-3-6.
