= Carl Georg Heise =

German art historian (1890–1979)

Carl Georg Heise (28 June 1890 – 11 August 1979) was a German art historian. From 1945 to 1955 he was director of the Kunsthalle Hamburg.

== Life ==
Heise was born into a Hamburg mercantile family with artistic interests. In about 1906 Aby Warburg became his mentor, and recommended to him a period of studying art history with Wilhelm Vöge in Freiburg. Subsequently, he went to Adolph Goldschmidt in Halle and—against Warburg's advice—to Heinrich Wölfflin in Munich. In 1910 he travelled to Italy with Wilhelm Waetzoldt and Warburg, visiting Venice and finally Ferrara, where Warburg was researching the frescoes in the Palazzo Schifanoia. In 1912 Warburg travelled with him to Rome to the art historians' congress. In 1914 he was rejected as a volunteer for military service, then studied in Berlin and Kiel where in 1915 he obtained his doctorate under the supervision of Count Vitzthum von Eckstädt with a thesis on North German painting in the Middle Ages, which he dedicated to Warburg. In 1916 Heise worked at the Hamburger Kunsthalle, where he compiled a catalogue under Gustav Pauli of the museum's older paintings. From 1919 to 1921 together with Giovanni Mardersteig and initially also Kurt Pinthus he edited the newspaper Genius. Zeitschrift für werdende und alte Kunst.

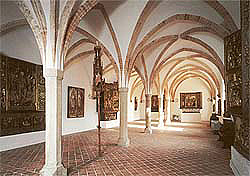
St. Anne's Museum, Lübeck

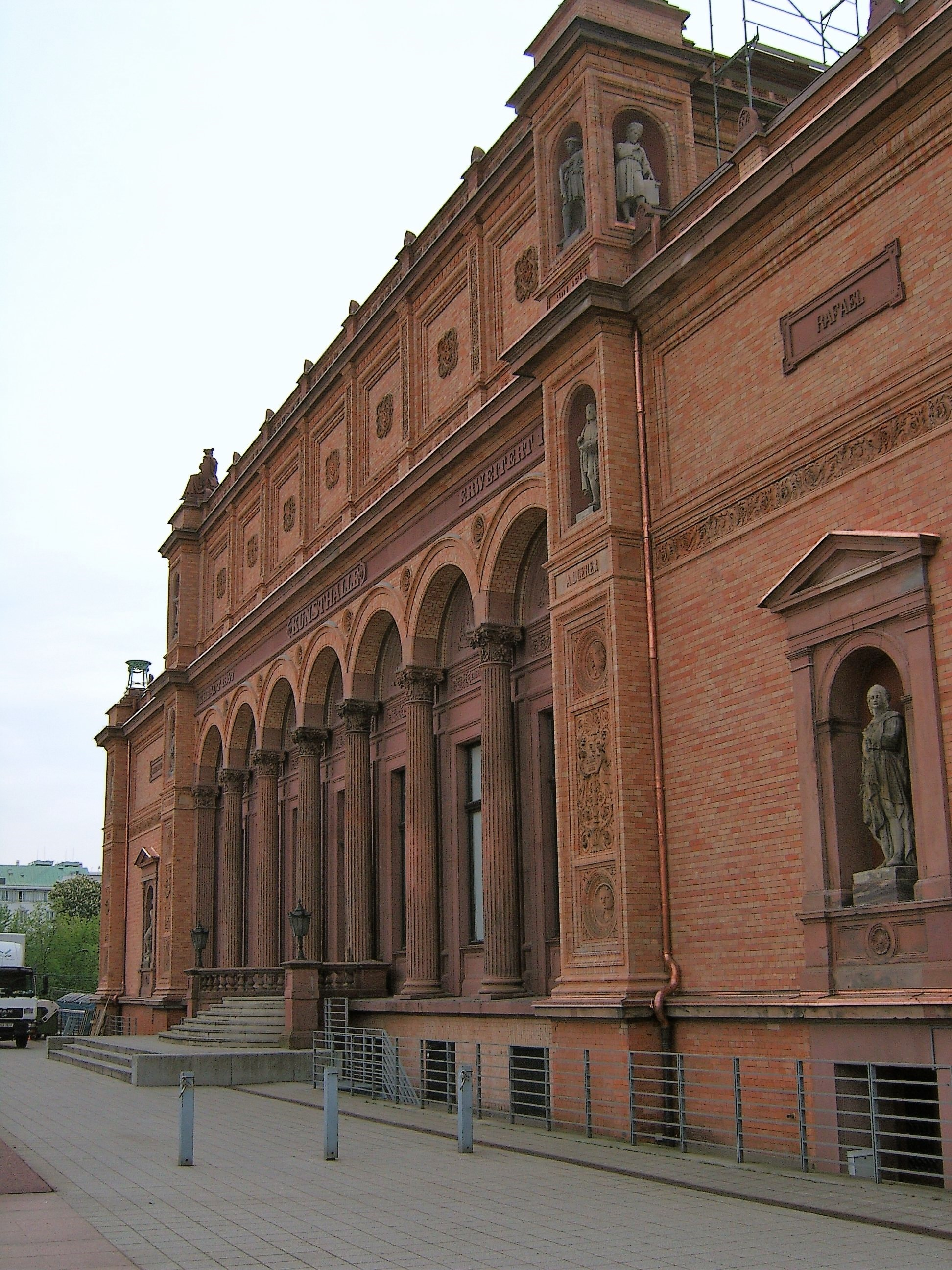
Kunsthalle Hamburg, Old Building

On 1 May 1920 he began work as museum director of St. Anne's Museum in Lübeck. In 1926 he came up with the Jubelkugel (a type of sweet) sold in connection with a lottery for the private financing of the festivities for the 700th anniversary of the city of Lübeck, which with the exhibition Lübeckische Kunst außerhalb Lübecks ("Lübeck Art outside Lübeck") became a great presentation of the significance of Lübeck in art throughout northern Europe. Heise initiated in 1929 one of the first photographic exhibitions, displaying photographs by Albert Renger-Patzsch, Emil Otto Hoppé, Hugo Erfurth and Wilhelm Castelli, then a young Lübeck photographer. In 1931 he curated an exhibition in the Overbeck Society on the occasion of the 400th anniversary of the establishment of the Katharineum zu Lübeck together with the drawing teacher Hans Peters and the works of pupils.

During his time in Lübeck Heise acquired works by Expressionists such as Ernst Barlach (for St. Catherine's Church), Franz Marc and particularly Edvard Munch as well as photographs of the Neue Sachlichkeit movement by Albert Renger-Patzsch. On Heise's initiative the building now known as the Behnhaus was acquired for the city in 1921 and equipped as a museum. He also prepared the way for the museum church of St. Katharine's, for which he had a vision as a sculpture hall of Lübeck art for the entire Baltic region; the plaster cast of Bernt Notke's "St. George's Group" (Sankt-Jürgen-Gruppe) is still reminiscent of this. Many of his acquisitions were later shown in the context of the "Entartete Kunst" exhibitions of 1937 onwards.

Because of his passionate advocacy of modern German art Heise was dismissed from his post during the Gleichschaltung, on 29 September 1933, although he remained in it until 1 January 1934. Between 1928 and 1933 he lived in the Zöllnerhaus ("Tax or customs collector's house") at the Burgtor in Lübeck, previously the residence of the author Ida Boy-Ed.

After the war he was the director of the Hamburger Kunsthalle from 1946 to 1956, and held a professorship at the University of Hamburg. The art-historical "Heise Collection", containing 9,000 titles, is today in the Staats- und Universitätsbibliothek Bremen ("State and University Library of Bremen"). He is counted as a significant champion of German classical modernism (Klassische Moderne).

== Writings ==
- (as editor) Unterhaltung mit Friedrich dem Großen (diaries of Henri de Catt 1758–1760, translated by Clara Hertz). Kiepenheuer: Weimar 1916.
- Norddeutsche Malerei. Studien zu ihrer Entwicklungsgeschichte im 15. Jahrhundert von Köln bis Hamburg). Wolff: Leipzig 1918.
- (as co-editor with Giovanni Mardersteig): Genius. Bilder und Aufsätze zu alter und neuer Kunst. Wolff: Munich 1920.
- Lübecker Plastik. Cohen: Bonn 1926.
- Lübecker Kunstpflege 1920–1933. Published on behalf of the Museum für Kunst- u. Kulturgeschichte. Lübeck 1934.
- Fabelwelt des Mittelalters. Phantasie- und Zierstücke Lübeckischer Werkleute aus drei Jahrhunderten. 120 photographs by W. Castelli. Rembrandt: Berlin 1936.
- Deutsche Bildschnitzer der Dürerzeit. Günther und Co.: Berlin c. 1940.
- Persönliche Erinnerungen an Aby Warburg. New York 1947.
- Der Lübecker Passionsaltar von Hans Memling. Ellermann: Hamburg 1950.
- Führer durch die Hamburger Kunsthalle. Christians: Hamburg 1955.
- (ed.): Rembrandt von Rijn, Die Nachtwache 1642. Reclam: Stuttgart 1957.
- Lovis Corinth. Bildnisse seiner Frau. Reclam: Stuttgart 1958.
- Der gegenwärtige Augenblick. Reden und Aufsätze aus vier Jahrzehnten. Gebr. Mann: Berlin 1960.
- Das Museum in Gegenwart und Zukunft. Festvortrag zur Jahrhundertfeier des Wallraf-Richartz-Museums. Cologne 1961.
- Grosse Zeichner des XIX. Jahrhunderts. Gebr. Mann: Berlin 1959.

== Bibliography ==
- Betthausen, P., Feist, P. H., Fork, C.: Metzler-Kunsthistoriker-Lexikon. Zweihundert Porträts deutschsprachiger Autoren aus vier Jahrhunderten, pp. 166–169. Metzler: Stuttgart u. a. 1999 ISBN 3-476-01535-1
- Enns, Abram: Kunst und Bürgertum. Die kontroversen zwanziger Jahre in Lübeck. Christians: Hamburg 1978 ISBN 3-7672-0571-8
- Heise, Carl Georg: Persönliche Erinnerungen an Aby Warburg (= Gratia 43); editing and commentary by Björn Biester and Hans-Michael Schäfer. Wiesbaden: Harrassowitz 2005 ISBN 3-447-05215-5
- Renger-Patzsch, A.: Lübeck. Mit einer Einleitung von Carl Georg Heise. Published on behalf of the Nordische Gesellschaft by Ernst Timm. Wasmuth: Berlin 1928 (jacket design by Alfred Mahlau)
- Westheider, Ortrud: Die neue Sicht der Dinge. Carl Georg Heises Lübecker Fotosammlung aus den 20er Jahren. Exhibition catalogue 1995. Kunsthalle: Hamburg 1985.
