= Janitschek =

Janitschek is a surname, a Germanized spelling of Czech/Slovak surname Janíček. Notable people with the surname include:

- Hans Janitschek (1934–2008), Austrian writer
- Hubert Janitschek (1846–1893), Austrian-German art historian
- Maria Janitschek, née Tölk (1859–1927), German writer of Austrian origin
