= Badt =

Badt (German pronunciation: [baːdt]) is a German surname. Notable people with the surname include:

- Bertha Badt-Strauss (1885–1970), German writer and Zionist
- Kurt Badt (1890–1973), German art historian

== See also ==
- BADT, Bank account debits tax
