= Dagmar Täube =

German art historian and museum director (born 1961)

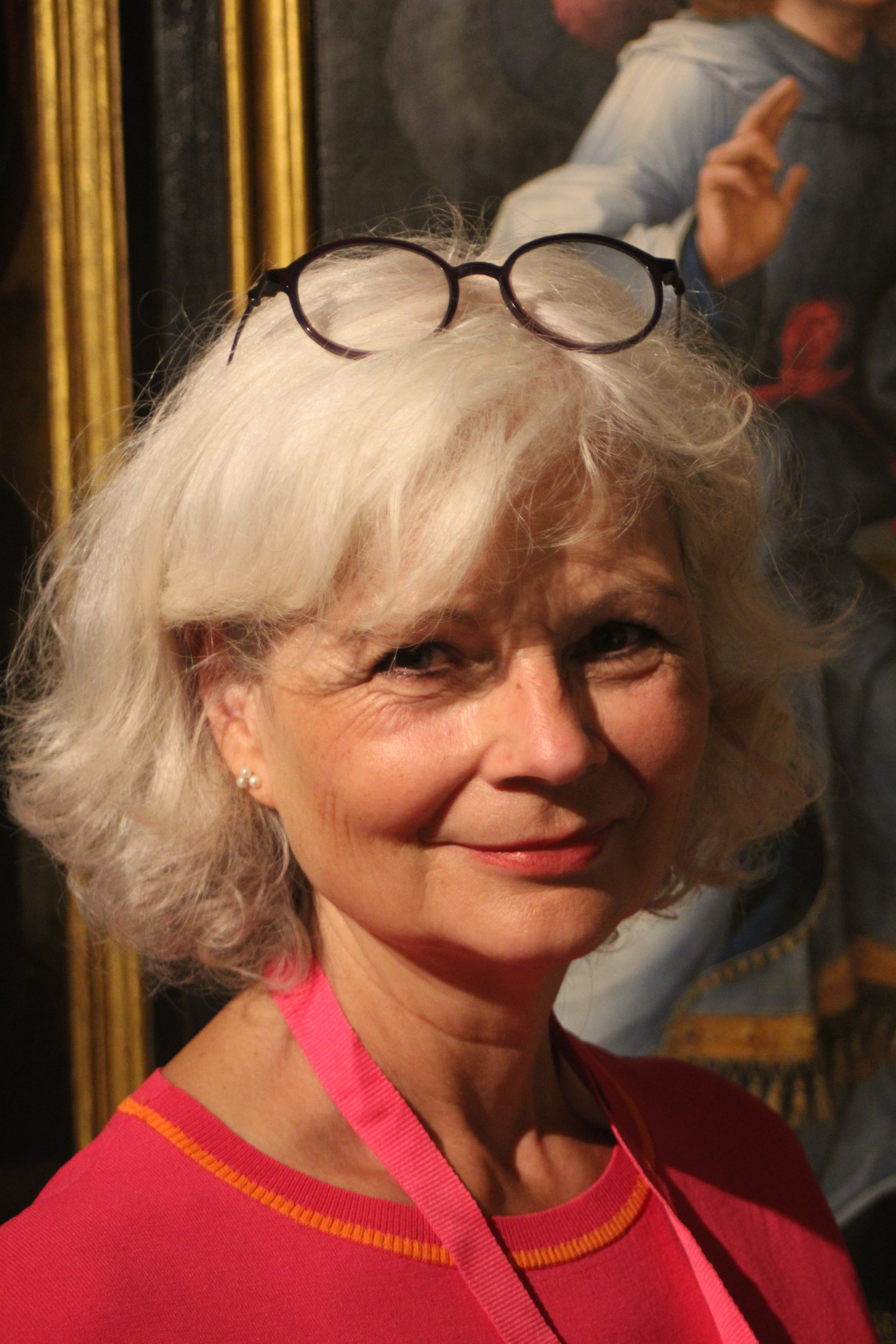
Dagmar Täube in 2023

Dagmar Täube (born 1961) is a German art historian and museum director. Since 2016 she has been in charge at the St. Anne's Museum Quarter in Lübeck.

The focus of her research interests is on stained glass and panel painting from the fourteenth, fifteenth and sixteenth centuries.

== Life ==
Dagmar Regina Täube was born in Grevenbroich, an industrial city a short distance to the west of Cologne. She studied at the University of Bonn between 1980 and 1991. Her focus was on art history, together with pedagogy and germanistics. Thanks to various bursaries (DAAD, Kölner Gymnasial- und Stiftungsfonds, Dr. Franz Stüsser foundation) she benefitted from foreign placements in 1987 and 1989 at Brussels, Utrecht and The Hague. She received her doctorate in 1991.

She began working as a freelance educator with the Museums Service in Cologne in 1986. Between 1991 she combined this with a post as academic assistant at the Wallraf-Richartz Museum in Cologne, during which period she choreographed the Stefan Lochner exhibition, celebrating a relatively little-known late-medieval artist whose work she has further championed and elucidated subsequently. Between 1994 and 1996 Täube was part of a research project into Gothic Painting in the research department of the city's Museums Service.

From 1996 till 1997 she worked as a curator at Cologne's Schnütgen Museum. Then in 1998 she took over at the German Glass-painting Museum at Linnich. That was also the year in which she led a team on a research visit to the Victoria and Albert Museum in London. Between 1999 and 2012 Täube was deputy director at the Schnütgen Museum in Cologne. That included a period, following the retirement in 2010 of Hiltrud Westermann-Angerhausen, as the museum's acting director. She curated a number of exhibitions and was in overall charge in 2010 when the newly extended museum was reopened with 60% more floor space than before. However, she left the Schnütgen after Moritz Woelk took over and the Glanz und Größe des Mittelalters exhibition that she had been curating. In March 2012 she became director of the "Draiflessen Collection" in Mettingen, a private sector initiative by the Brenninkmeijer family (C&A) to collect, secure and process the extensive records of the family's business and family history.

Between 2014 and 2016 Dagmar Täube worked freelance as head of "artcura. premium art support". Since 2001 she has also held a seasonal teaching contract with the Heinrich Heine University at Düsseldorf.

On 1 September 2016 (to take effect on 15 October 2016) the Lübeck Arts and Culture foundation appointed Dagmar Täube as director of the St. Anne's Museum Quarter, the Holstentor Museum and of the St. Catherine's Museum-church. That made her a successor to Hildegard Vogeler (who had already retired back in 2014) and Thorsten Rodiek. (The city authorities took the opportunity to consolidate the St Anne's Museum and the St Anne's Hall into a single administrative unit.)
