= Sauerländer =

Sauerländer could refer to:

- Something from Sauerland, a region of North Rhine-Westphalia, Germany
- Willibald Sauerländer (1924–2018), German art historian
