= Renger =

Renger is both a surname and a given name. Notable people with the name include:

- Annemarie Renger (1919–2008), German politician
- Thomas Renger (born 1972), German sitting volleyball player
- Renger van der Zande (born 1986), Dutch racing driver

== See also ==
- Albert Renger-Patzsch (1897–1966), German photographer
