= Hans Jantzen =

German art historian (1881-1967)

- Born: April 26, 1881; Hamburg
- Died: February 15, 1967 (aged 85); Freiburg im Breisgau, West Germany
- Education: University of Berlin; University of Halle
- Occupation: Art historian
- Writing career
- Years active: 1912–1951
- Period: 20th century
- Subjects: Medieval art, Gothic art, Dutch art, Ottonian art

Hans Jantzen (26 April 1881 in Hamburg – 15 February 1967 in Freiburg im Breisgau) was a German art historian who specialized in medieval art.

== Life and work ==
Jantzen first studied law, then history of art, archaeology and philosophy at various universities. For instance, at the University of Berlin he studied under Heinrich Wölfflin and at the University of Halle under Adolph Goldschmidt. In 1908, he completed his PhD dissertation on architecture depicted in Netherlandish paintings. In 1912, after finishing his Habilitationsschrift on color in Dutch painting of the 17th century, he taught art history in Halle.

In 1916, after a short period as a World War I soldier, he was appointed professor of art history at the University of Freiburg in the department Wilhelm Vöge had created. During his Freiburg years, he became a friend of Ernst Buschor, Ludwig Curtius, Edmund Husserl and Martin Heidegger. His attention turned to the Middle Ages, especially Gothic art. In 1925, he published a book on German sculptors of the thirteenth century and two years later his groundbreaking essay, "Über den gotischen Kirchenraum", which introduced the term "diaphane Struktur" into discussions about Gothic architecture.

In 1931, he moved to the University of Frankfurt, and in 1935 he was appointed professor of art history at the Ludwig-Maximilians-Universität München (LMU). As he sympathized with Nazi ideology for some time, he was dismissed from teaching after World War II, but reinstated shortly thereafter. In 1947, he published a monograph on Ottonian art. In 1951 he retired from LMU, returning to Freiburg where he lectured as an honorary professor in 1953. In 1962, he became known to English-speaking audiences when his book on three Gothic cathedrals, Kunst der Gotik, appeared in English as High Gothic.

Jantzen's students included, among others, Kurt Bauch, Martin Gosebruch, Julius S. Held, Robert Oertel, Willibald Sauerländer and Paul Wescher.

== Select publications ==
- Das niederländische Architekturbild. PhD dissertation, University of Halle, 1908. Published, Leipzig, 1910.
- "Die Raumdarstellung bei kleiner Augendistanz". Zeitschrift für Ästhetik und allgemeine Kunstwissenschaft, vol. 6, 1911, pp. 119–123.
- Rembrandt. Bielefeld, 1911.
- Farbenwahl und Farbengebung in der holländischen Malerei des XVII. Jahrhunderts. Habilitationsschrift, University of Halle, 1219. Published, Parchim i.M.,1912.
- Altchristliche Kunst. Bielefeld, 1914.
- "Über Prinzipien der Farbengebung in der Malerei". In Bericht / Kongress für Ästhetik und Allgemeine Kunstwissenschaft. Stuttgart, 1914, pp. 322–329.
- Bilderatlas zur Einführung in die Kunstgeschichte. Esslingen, 1917.
- Vermeer: Das Milchmädchen. Vienna, 1923.
- Deutsche Bildhauer des dreizehnten Jahrhunderts. Leipzig, 1925.
- Konrad Witz. Bielefeld, 1927.
- "Über den gotischen Kirchenraum. Vortrag, gehalten bei der Jahresfeier der Freiburger Wissenschaftlichen Gesellschaft am 5. Nov. 1927". Freiburg, 1928.
- Das Münster zu Freiburg. Burg bei Magdeburg, 1929.
- Leitfaden für den kunstgeschichtlichen Unterricht in der höheren Mädchenschule. Berlin. 1930.
- Das Münster zu Strassburg. Burg bei Magdeburg, 1933.
- Deutsche Kunst: Vom Karolingischen bis zum Barock. Cologne, 1935.
- Geist und Schicksal der deutschen Kunst. Cologne, 1935.
- "Albrecht Altdorfers Passionsaltar aus St. Florian". Das Werk des Künstlers, vol. 1, 1939, pp. 42–59.
- "Giotto und der gotische Stil". Das Werk des Künstlers, vol. 1, 1939, pp. 441–454.
- "Die zeitliche Abfolge der Paduaner Fresken Giottos". Jahrbuch der Preußischen Kunstsammlungen, vol. 60, 1939, pp. 187–196.
- Das Wort als Bild in der frühmittelalterlichen Buchmalerei. Cologne, 1940.
- "Deutsche Kunstwissenschaft 1933-1942," Forschungen und Fortschritte, vol. 18, December 1942, pp. 341–348.
- "Heinrich Wölfflin". Jahrbuch der Bayerischen Akademie der Wissenschaften (Philosophisch-historische Klasse), 1944–48, pp. 164–167.
- "Wilhelm Pinder", Jahrbuch der Bayerischen Akademie der Wissenschaften (Philosophisch-historische Klasse), 1944–48, pp. 178–179.
- "Burgundische Gotik", Sitzungsberichte der Bayerischen Akademie der Wissenschaften (Philosophisch-historische Klasse), vol. 5, 1948, pp. 3–37.
- "Die Einheit Europas in der Geschichte seiner Kunst", Geistige Welt, vol. 3, 1948, pp. 115–117.
- Über den gotischen Kirchenraum und andere Aufsätze. Berlin, 1951.
- "Otto Schmitt". Kunstchronik, vol. 4, 1951, pp. 219–221.
- "Edouards Manets Bar aux Folies-Bergère". In Beiträge für Georg Swarzenski zum 11. Januar 1951. Berlin, 1951, pp. 228–232.
- Dürer: Der Maler. Bern, 1952.
- "Das niederländische Architekturbild". In Nederlandse Architektuurschilders 1600-1900. Exh. cat. Centraal Museum Utrecht. Utrecht, 1953, pp. 1a-10a.
- "Wilhelm Vöge". Kunstchronik, vol. 6, no. 4, 1953, pp. 104–109.
- "Unbekannte Arbeiten des 'Meisters mit dem Blattfries' und seines Kreises". Zeitschrift für Kunstwissenschaft, vol. 10, 1956, pp. 193–198.
- Die Kunstgelehrten. Munich, 1959.
- Die Naumburger Stifterfiguren. Stuttgart, 1959.
- High Gothic: The Classic Cathedrals of Chartres, Reims, Amiens. Translated from the German by James Palmes. New York, 1962.
- Die Gotik des Abendlandes: Idee und Wandel, Cologne, 1962.
- Über den kunstgeschichtlichen Raumbegriff. Darmstadt, 1962.
- Der Bamberger Reiter. Stuttgart, 1964.
- Die Hagia Sophia des Kaisers Justinian in Konstantinopel. Cologne, 1967.
- Ottonische Kunst. F. Bruckmann, München 1947. Neuausgabe: Rowohlts deutsche Enzyklopädie, Nr. 89; Reinbek bei Hamburg 1959. Neuausgabe: Reimer, Berlin, 1990
- Kunst der Gotik: Klassische Kathedralen Frankreichs – Chartres, Reims, Amiens. Rowohlt, Hamburg 1957. Erweiterte Neuausgabe: Reimer, Berlin 1987, ISBN 3-496-00898-9.
