= Willibald Sauerländer =

German art historian (1924-2018)

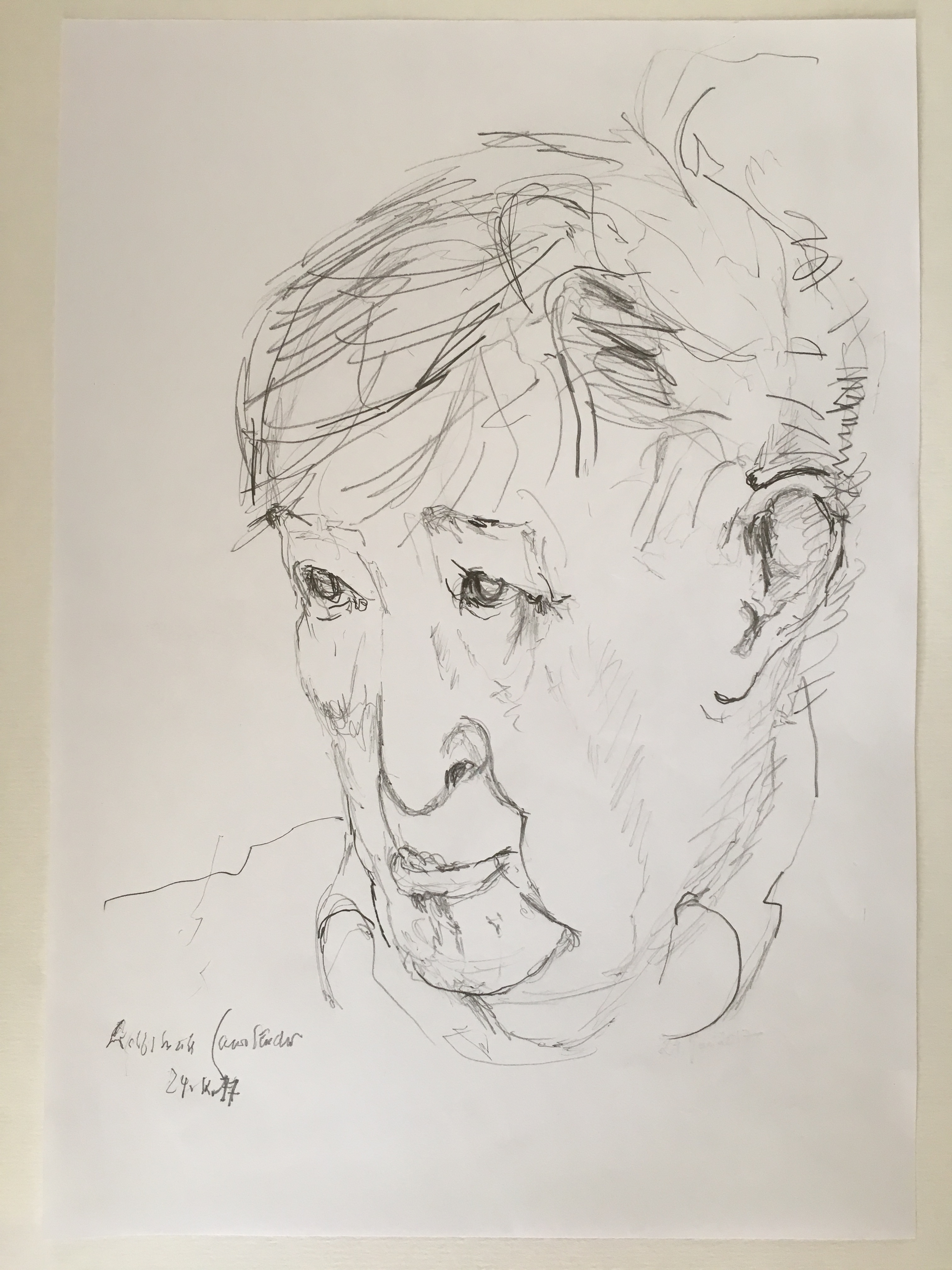
- Born: 29 February 1924; Bad Waldsee, Germany
- Died: 18 April 2018 (aged 94); Munich, Germany
- Education: LMU Munich
- Occupation: art historian
- Scientific career
- Thesis: Das gotische Figurenportal in Frankreich: Studien zur Geschichte der französischen Portalskulptur von Chartres West bis zum Reimser Josephsmeister (1953)
- Doctoral advisor: Hans Jantzen

Willibald Sauerländer (29 February 1924 in Bad Waldsee, Württemberg, Germany – 18 April 2018 in Munich, Germany) was a German art historian specializing in Medieval French sculpture. From 1970 to 1989, he was director of the prestigious Zentralinstitut für Kunstgeschichte, Munich.

== Life and work ==
The son of a late-Impressionist painter who disliked art historians, Sauerländer grew up in a house with works of old and modern art. Notwithstanding, he began studying art history in 1946, at a time when Munich was in ruins, the intellectual situation extremely truncated, and the center of everything the study of medieval art, in a curious kind of secular, "aesthetic mystical" spiritualism, which he did not like. He had his main focus on medieval sculpture and architecture with a strong focus on France, Nicolas Poussin, and the French 18th century, but at the same time he opposed Hans Sedlmayr for his reactionary fundamentalist views. He received his Ph.D. in art history at the Ludwig-Maximilians-Universität München (LMU) in 1953 under Hans Jantzen.

After leaving university, he went to Paris for five years. During their early Paris years Sauerländer and his wife guided tourists and they worked in the Bibliothèque Nationale and at the Institut de l'Histoire de l'Art in order to gain their life. He also taught German at a French lycée. Early on, the personal friendship and scholarship of Louis Grodecki was formative to his art historical methodology. From 1959 to 1961, he taught art history in Paris, and in 1961 in Princeton, NJ at the Institute for Advanced Study. During this first phase in the United States, he met Meyer Schapiro and became a friend of the German émigrés Erwin Panofsky, Walter Friedländer and Richard Krautheimer.

From 1961 to 1962 he lectured as an assistant professor at the University of Marburg and from 1962 to 1970 he was professor of art history at the University of Freiburg, where he utilized the photographic collection of its great medievalist, Wilhelm Vöge. From 1963 to 1965 and 1969 to 1970 he was also a visiting professor at the Institute of Fine Arts, New York University. There he developed an interest in Pop Art, particularly in the works of Robert Rauschenberg, Claes Oldenburg and Andy Warhol. In 1970, after having published his best known book on Gothic Sculpture in France (English edition, 1971), he was appointed director at the Zentralinstitut für Kunstgeschichte, Munich. In 1973 he was elected member of the Bavarian Academy of Sciences and Humanities. In the 1970s he read Marc Bloch and had contacts with Georges Duby and closure with Jacques Le Goff, which essentially changed his work. In the 1980s he held several visiting appointments in France and the US, including the College de France, Paris; University of Wisconsin, Madison; Harvard University; and the University of California, Berkeley. In 1989 he retired from the Zentralinstitut für Kunstgeschichte. In 1991 he presented the A. W. Mellon Lectures in the Fine Arts at the National Gallery of Art, Washington, DC. He is a friend of Thomas W. Gaehtgens, Director of the Getty Research Institute. He was a reviewer for the doctoral dissertation of E. Wayne Craven.

Sauerländer is known for having rewritten the history of early French Gothic Sculpture. In his historiographic writing, he characterized post-World War II art history in Munich as "would-be Positivism," citing a shift toward empiricism and positivism. He also thinks that photography seems to be more interesting than other fields of modern art and has a special interest in the photographic work of August Sander, Thomas Struth, Thomas Demand and Andreas Gursky.

Photographs by Willibald Sauerländer are held at the Conway Library in the Courtauld, London, and are being digitised.

== Awards ==
- Honorary degree of the University of Strasbourg
- Perfezionato d'Honore Scuola, Pisa
- 1994 Correspondent étranger de l'Académie des Inscriptions et Belles-Lettres
- 1995 Bavarian Maximilian Order for Science and Art
- 2007 Grand Prix de la Société française d'archéologie

== Publications ==
- Das gotische Figurenportal in Frankreich: Studien zur Geschichte der französischen Portalskulptur von Chartres West bis zum Reimser Josephsmeister. PhD dissertation. Ludwig-Maximilians-Universität München, 1953.
- Die Kathedrale von Chartres. Stuttgart: Günther, 1954.
- "Beiträge zur Geschichte der "frühgotischen" Skulptur". Zeitschrift für Kunstgeschichte, vol. 19, 1956, pp. 1–34.
- "Die Jahreszeiten: Ein Beitrag zur allegorischen Landschaft beim späten Poussin". Münchner Jahrbuch der bildenden Kunst, vol. 7, 1956, pp. 169–184.
- "Die Marienkrönungsportale von Senlis und Mantes." Wallraf-Richartz Jahrbuch, vol. 20, 1958, pp. 115–162.
- "Die kunstgeschichtliche Stellung der Westportale von Notre Dame in Paris." Marburger Jahrbuch für Kunstwissenschaft, vol. 17, 1959, pp. 1–56.
- "Les modèles de la Renaissance macédonnienne dans la sculpture de Paris et d'Amiens au début du XIII. siècle". In Actes du XIXe Congrès international d'histoire de l'art, Paris, 1959, pp. 125–133.
- "Sens and York: An Inquiry into the Sculptures from St. Mary's Abbey in the Yorkshire Museum". The Journal of the British Archaeological Association, vol. 22, 1959, pp. 53–69.
- "Skulpturen des 12. Jahrhunderts in Chalons-sur-Marne". Zeitschrift für Kunstgeschichte, vol. 25, 1962, pp. 97–124.
- "Cathédrales". Art de France, vol. 3, 1963, pp. 210–219.
- Die Bronzetür von Nowgorod. Munich: Piper, 1963.
- Jean-Antoine Houdon: Voltaire. Stuttgart: Reclam, 1963.
- Die Skulptur des Mittelalters. Frankfurt am Main: Ullstein, 1963.
- "Tombeaux chartrains du premier quart du XIIIe siècle". L'Information d'histoire de l'art, vol. 9, 1964, pp. 47–60.
- "Die Kathedrale von Chartres". In Erich Steingräber, ed., Meilensteine europäischer Kunst. Munich, 1965, pp. 131–170.
- (with Georg Kauffmann, eds.), Walter Friedlaender zum 90. Geburtstag: Eine Festgabe seiner europäischen Schüler, Freunde und Verehrer. Berlin: Walter de Gruyter, 1965.
- Von Sens bis Strassburg: Ein Beitrag Zur Kunstgeschichtlichen Stellung der Strassburger Querhausskulpturen. Berlin: Walter De Gruyter, 1966.
- "Über die Komposition des Weltgerichtstympanons in Autun". Zeitschrift für Kunstgeschichte, vol. 29, 1966, pp. 261–294.
- "Das Stiftergrabmal des Grafen Eberhard in der Klosterkirche zu Murbach". In Kurt Badt and Martin Gosebruch, eds., Amici amico: Festschrift für Werner Gross zu seinem 65. Geburtstag am 25. 11. 1966. Munich: Fink, 1968, pp. 59–77.
- "Über die ursprüngliche Reihenfolge von Fragonards 'Amours des Bergers' ". Münchner Jahrbuch der bildenden Kunst, vol. 19, 1968, pp. 127–156.
- Gotische Skulptur in Frankreich: 1140 – 1270. Munich: Hirmer, 1970.
- "Sculpture on Early Gothic Churches: The State of Research and Open Questions". Gesta, vol. 9, no. 2, 1970, pp. 32–48.
- "Die kunstgeschichtliche Stellung der Figurenportale des 13. Jahrhunderts in Westfalen". Westfalen, vol. 49, 1971, pp. 1–76.
- Gothic Sculpture in France: 1140–1270. New York: Abrams, 1971.
- "Löwen in Lyon". In Artur Rosenauer and Gerold Weber, eds., Kunsthistorische Forschungen. Salzburg, 1972, pp. 215–224.
- "Cluny und Speyer". In Josef Fleckenstein, ed., Investiturstreit und Reichsverfassung. Sigmaringen, 1973, pp. 9–32.
- "Zu dem romanischen Kruzifix von Moissac". In Peter Bloch and Tilmann Buddensieg, eds., Intuition und Kunstwissenschaft. Berlin, 1973, pp. 303–317.
- Peter Paul Rubens. Zurich: Kindler, 1974.
- "Erweiterung des Denkmalbegriffs?" Denkmalpflege, 1975, pp. 187–201.
- "Reims und Bamberg: Zu Art und Umfang der Übernahmen". Zeitschrift für Kunstgeschichte, vol. 39, 1976, pp. 167–192.
- "Spätstaufische Skulpturen in Sachsen und Thüringen: Überlegungen zum Stand der Forschung". Zeitschrift für Kunstgeschichte, vol. 41, 1978, pp. 181–216.
- "Die Naumburger Stifterfiguren". In Reiner Haussherr and Christian Väterlein, eds., Die Zeit der Staufer, 5. Supplement: Vorträge und Forschungen. Stuttgart, 1979, pp. 169–245.
- "Architecture and the Figurative Arts: The North". In Robert L. Benson and Giles Constable, eds., Renaissance and Renewal in the Twelfth Century. Oxford, 1982, pp. 671–710.
- "From 'Stilus' to Style: Reflection on the Fate of a Notion". Art History, vol. 6, 1983, 253–270.
- "Davids 'Morat à son dernier soupir' oder Malerei und Terreur". Idea, vol. 2, 1983, pp. 49–88.
- Das Königsportal in Chartres: Heilsgeschichte und Lebenswirklichkeit. Frankfurt am Main: Fischer Taschenbuch, 1984.
- "Stiftergedenken und Stifterfiguren in Naumburg". In Karl Schmid and Joachim Wollasch, eds., Memoria. Munich, 1984, pp. 354–383.
- (ed.), Studien zur mittelalterlichen Kunst 800–1250: Festschrift für Florentine Mütherich zum 70. Geburtstag. Munich: Prestel, 1985.
- "Der Kunsthistoriker angesichts des entlaufenen Kunstbegriffs: Zerfällt das Paradigma einer Disziplin?" Jahrbuch des Zentralinstituts für Kunstgeschichte, vol. 1, 1985, pp. 375–399.
- "La cultura figurativa emiliana in età romanica". In Nicholaus e l'arte del suo tempo, vol. 1, 1985, pp. 51–92.
- "Die gotische Kathedralfassade". In Werner Busch, ed., Kunst. Weinheim, 1987, pp. 54–79.
- "Style or Transition? The Fallacies of Classification Discussed in the Light of German Architecture 1190 – 1260". Architectural History, vol. 30, 1987, pp. 1–29.
- "Medieval Paris, Center of European Taste: Fame and Realities". In George Mauner, ed., Paris. Abington, 1988, pp. 12–45.
- "La cathédrale et la révolution". Conférences plénières, 1990, pp. 67–106.
- Das Jahrhundert der großen Kathedralen: 1140 – 1260. Munich: Beck, 1990.
- "Gothic Art Reconsidered: New Aspects and Open Questions". In Elizabeth C. Parker, ed., The Cloisters. The Metropolitan Museum of Art, New York, 1992, pp. 26–40.
- "Romanesque Sculpture in its Architectural Context". In Deborah Kahn, ed., The Romanesque Frieze and its Spectator. London, 1992, pp. 17–44.
- Von den "Sonderleistungen Deutscher Kunst" zur "Ars Sacra": Kunstgeschichte in Deutschland 1945–1950. Frankfurt am Main: Fischer, 1992.
- "Erweiterung des Denkmalbegriffs?" In Wilfried Lipp, ed., Denkmal, Werte, Gesellschaft. Frankfurt am Main, 1993, pp. 120–149.
- "Dal gotico europeo in Italia al gotico italiano in Europa". In Valentino Pace and Martina Bagnoli, eds., Il Gotico europeo in Italia. Napoli, 1994, pp. 8–21.
- Initialen : Ein Versuch über das verwirrte Verhältnis von Schrift und Bild im Mittelalter. Wolfenbüttel, 1994.
- "Gedanken über das Nachleben des gotischen Kirchenraums im Spiegel der Malerei". Münchner Jahrbuch der bildenden Kunst, vol. 45, 1994, pp. 165–182.
- "Integration: a closed or open proposal?" In Virginia Chieffo Raguin and Kathryn Brush, eds., Artistic Integration in Gothic Buildings. Toronto, 1995, pp. 1–18.
- "Benedetto Antelami: Per un bilancio critico". In Albert Dietl and Chiara Frugoni, eds., Benedetto Antelami e il Battistero di Parma. Torino, 1995, pp. 3–69.
- "Struggling with a deconstructed Panofsky". In Irving Lavin, ed., Meaning in the Visual Arts. Princeton, NJ, 1995, pp. 385–396.
- Das Königsportal in Chartres: Heilsgeschichte und Lebenswirklichkeit. Frankfurt am Main: Fischer-Taschenbuch, 1996.
- Kunsthistoriker/Kunsthistorikerin (Blätter zur Berufskunde). Bielefeld: Bertelsmann, 1998.
- "Zur Stiftertumba für Heinrich den Löwen und Herzogin Mathilde in St. Blasius in Braunschweig". In Joachim Ehlers and Dietrich Kötzsche, eds., Der Welfenschatz und sein Umkreis. Mainz, 1998, pp. 439–483.
- Cathedrals and Sculpture. 2 volumes. London: Pindar Press, 1999–2000.
- Die Luft auf der Spitze des Pinsels: Kritische Spaziergänge durch Bildersäle. Munich: Hanser, 2002.
- Ein Versuch über die Gesichter Houdons: Thomas W. Gaehtgens zum 24. Juni 2000. Munich: Deutscher Kunstverlag, 2002.
- "Antiqui et moderni at Reims". Gesta, vol. 42, no. 1, 2003, pp. 19–37.
- "Centre et périphérie: Le cas du portail de Lausanne". In Peter Kurmann and Martin Rohde, eds., Die Kathedrale von Lausanne und ihr Marienportal im Kontext der europäischen Gotik. Berlin, 2004, pp. 203–217.
- Romanesque Art: Problems and Monuments. London: Pindar Press, 2004.
- "Strasbourg, cathédrale: Le bras sud du transept, architecture et sculpture". In Session, Congrès Archéologique de France. Société Française d'Archéologie, Paris, vol. 162, 2004, pp. 171–184.
- Essai sur les visages des bustes de Houdon. Paris, 2005.
- "Noch einmal Poussins Landschaften: Ein Versuch über Möglichkeiten und Grenzen der ikonologischen Interpretation". Münchner Jahrbuch der bildenden Kunst, vol. 56, 2005, pp. 107–137.
- "The Fate of the Face in Medieval Art". In Charles T. Little, ed., Set in Stone. Metropolitan Museum of Art, New York, 2006, pp. 3–17.
- "Herkules in der politischen Ikonographie: Zum Herkulesteppich in der Bayerischen Akademie der Wissenschaften". In Sabine Heym, Herkules besiegt die Lernäische Hydra. Munich, 2006, pp. 21–94.
- "Architecture gothique et mise en scène des reliques : l'exemple de la Sainte-Chapelle". In Christine Hediger, ed., La Sainte-Chapelle de Paris. Turnhout, 2007, pp. 113–136.
- "Kunstgeschichte und Bildwissenschaft". In Josef Früchtl and Maria Moog-Grünewald, eds., Ästhetik in metaphysikkritischen Zeiten. Zeitschrift für Ästhetik und allgemeine Kunstwissenschaft, special issue, Hamburg, 2007, pp. 93–108.
- "Paysage de Poussin: Les limites de l'interprétation iconologique". Studiolo, vol. 6, 2008, pp. 191–232.
- "Romanesque Art 2000: A Worn Out Notion?" In Colum Hourihane, ed., Romanesque Art and Thought in the Twelfth Century. Princeton, NJ, 2008, pp. 40–56.
- "Von Stilus zu Stil: Reflexionen über das Schicksal eines Begriffs". In Caecilie Weissert, ed., Stil in der Kunstgeschichte. Darmstadt, 2009, pp. 102–122.
- "Transzendenz nach dem Tode Gottes? Barnett Newmans 'Stations of the Cross' und Mark Rothkos 'Chapel' ". In Markus Kleinert, ed., Kunst und Religion, Mainz, 2010, pp. 79–108.
- Der katholische Rubens. Von den Heiligen und Märtyrern. Munich: C. H. Beck, 2011.
- Kunststadt München? Unterbrochene Lebenswege. Munich, 2012.
- Manet malt Monet: Ein Sommer in Argenteuil. Munich: Beck, 2012.
- Reims – die Königin der Kathedralen: Himmelsstadt und Erinnerungsort. Berlin and Munich, 2013.
- Meister von Meßkirch, Der Wildensteiner Altar, Staatsgalerie Stuttgart – Meister von Meßkirch, Der Heilige Martin mit Bettler und dem Stifter Gottfried Werner von Zimmern. Staatliche Kunsthalle Karlsruhe, 2014.
