= St. Anne's Museum Quarter, Lübeck =

Museum in Germany

Coordinates: 53°51′45.6″N 10°41′20.9″E

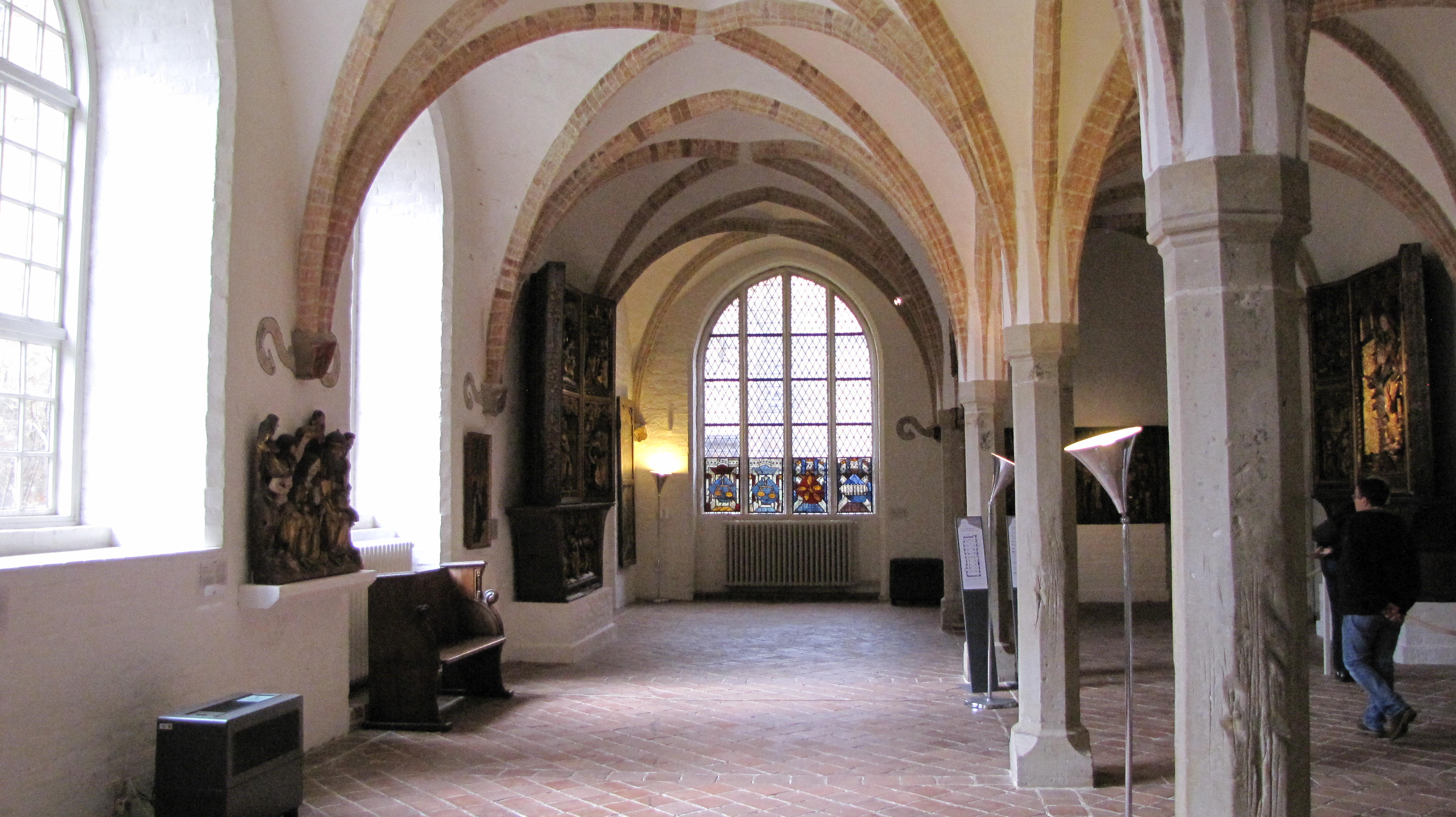
St. Anne's Museum

St. Anne's Museum Quarter, Lübeck, Schleswig-Holstein

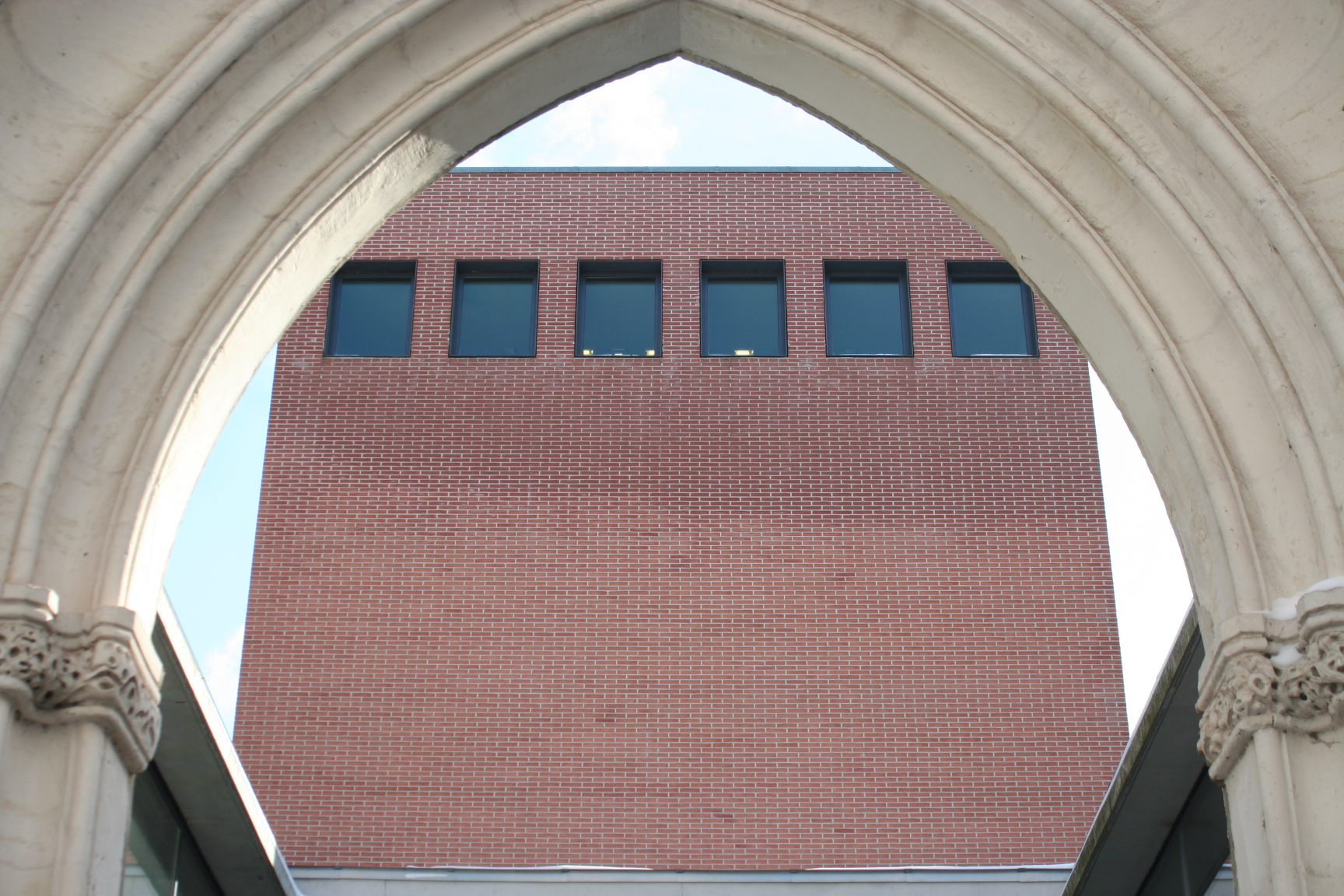
The new Kunsthalle seen through the old church portal

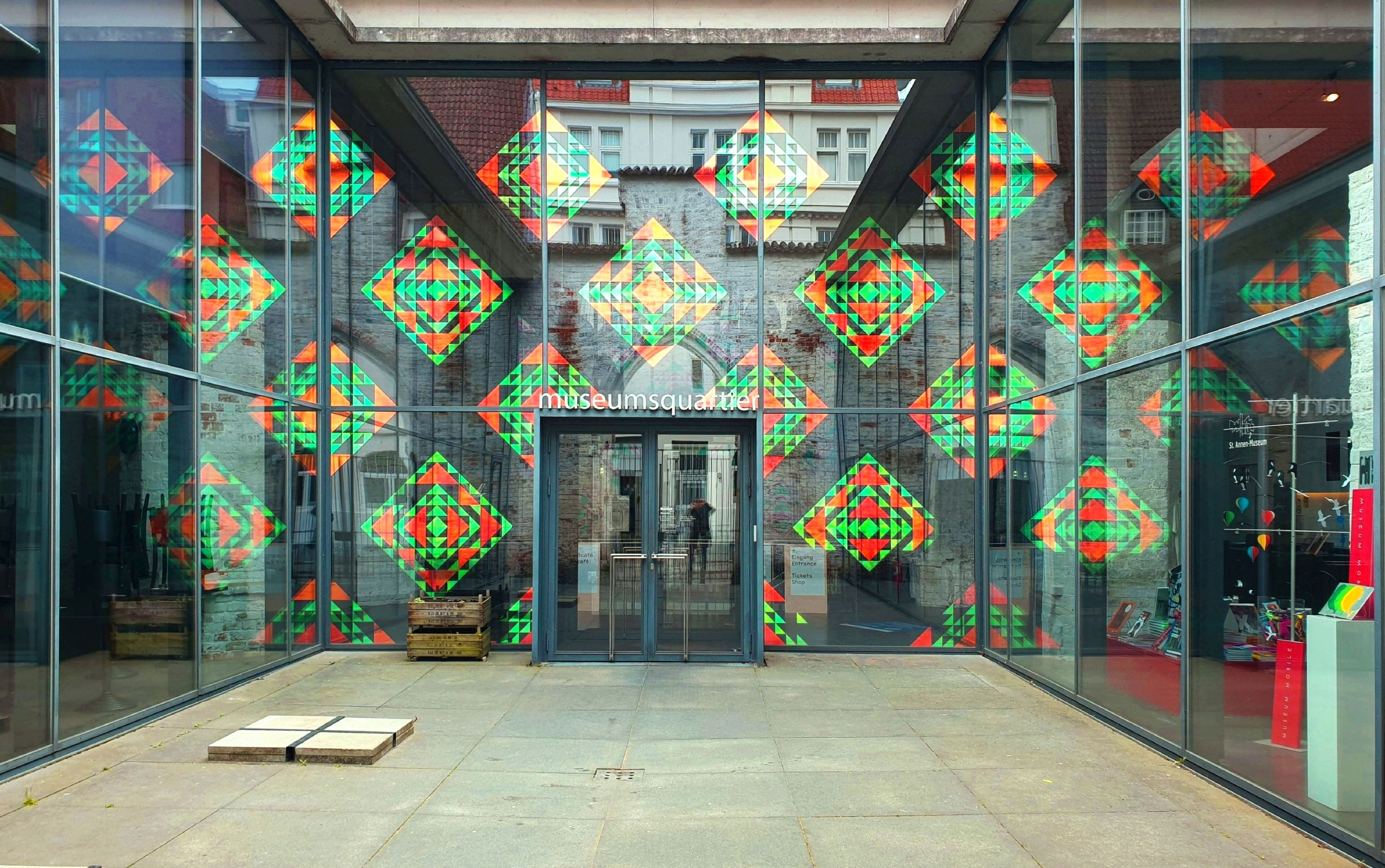
Entrance of the Museumsquartier

St. Anne's Museum Quarter (German: Museumsquartier St. Annen) was previously an Augustinian nunnery, St. Anne's Priory (German: Sankt-Annen-Kloster). Since 1915 it has housed St. Anne's Museum, one of Lübeck's museums of art and cultural history containing Germany's largest collection of medieval sculpture and altar-pieces, including the famous altars by Hans Memling (formerly at Lübeck Cathedral), Bernt Notke, Hermen Rode, Jacob van Utrecht and Benedikt Dreyer.

These are exhibited on the building's first floor is a museum and art exhibition hall located near St. Giles Church and next to the synagogue in the south-east of the city of Lübeck, Germany.

On the building's second floor is exhibited a large collection of home decor items and interiors of different periods, showing how the area's citizens lived from medieval times up to the 1800s.

A modern addition houses special exhibits.

The museum is part of the Lübeck World Heritage site.

== History of the building ==
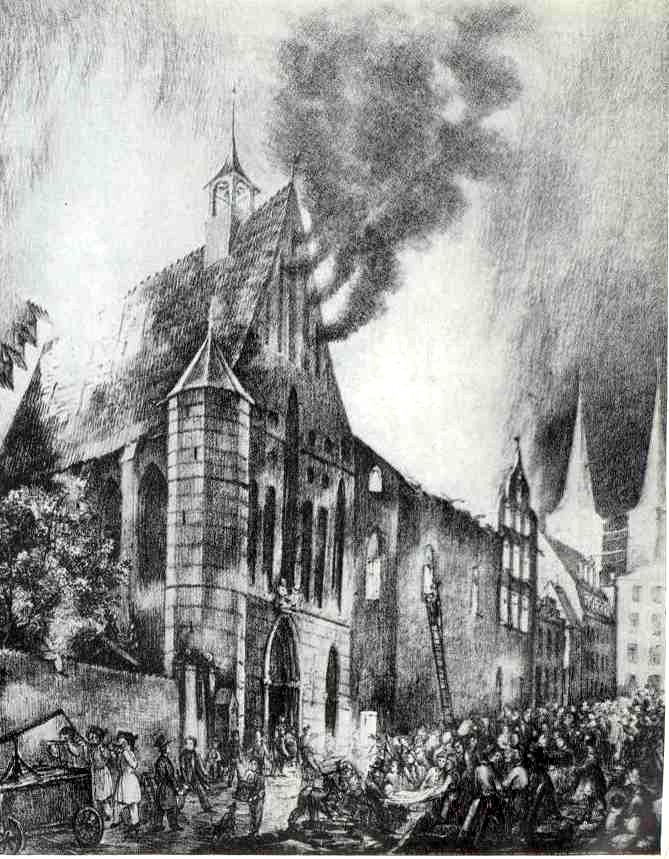
The burning of the St.-Annen-Kloster in 1843

St. Anne's Priory and the associated church, which was constructed rather quickly due to lack of space, were built 1502–1515 in late Brick Gothic style. The monastery was used mainly for the accommodation of unmarried women who were citizens in Lübeck. Following the suggestion of the Bishop of Lübeck the monastery and the church were dedicated to Saint Anne. A few years later the monastery was closed during the Reformation: the last of the nuns left in 1532. In 1610 a poorhouse was established here. Later, parts of the monastery were used as a prison. For this purpose another wing was built in 1778, the so-called Spinnhaus ("spin house"). The care of the poor and the custody of prisoners existed under one roof.

In 1843 parts of the monastery and the church were burnt down. During the restoration of the priory building, the church was demolished except for a few fragments that stayed as ruins.

Most of the rooms on the ground floor are preserved in their original condition: the cloister, the refectories, the Remter (the largest room of the nunnery, probably the working and day room of the nuns, and from 1733 the refectory of the poorhouse), the chapter house, and the sacristy of the nuns' church. In the south western corner of the cloister is the calefactory.

== St. Anne's museum (Museum for history of art and culture) ==
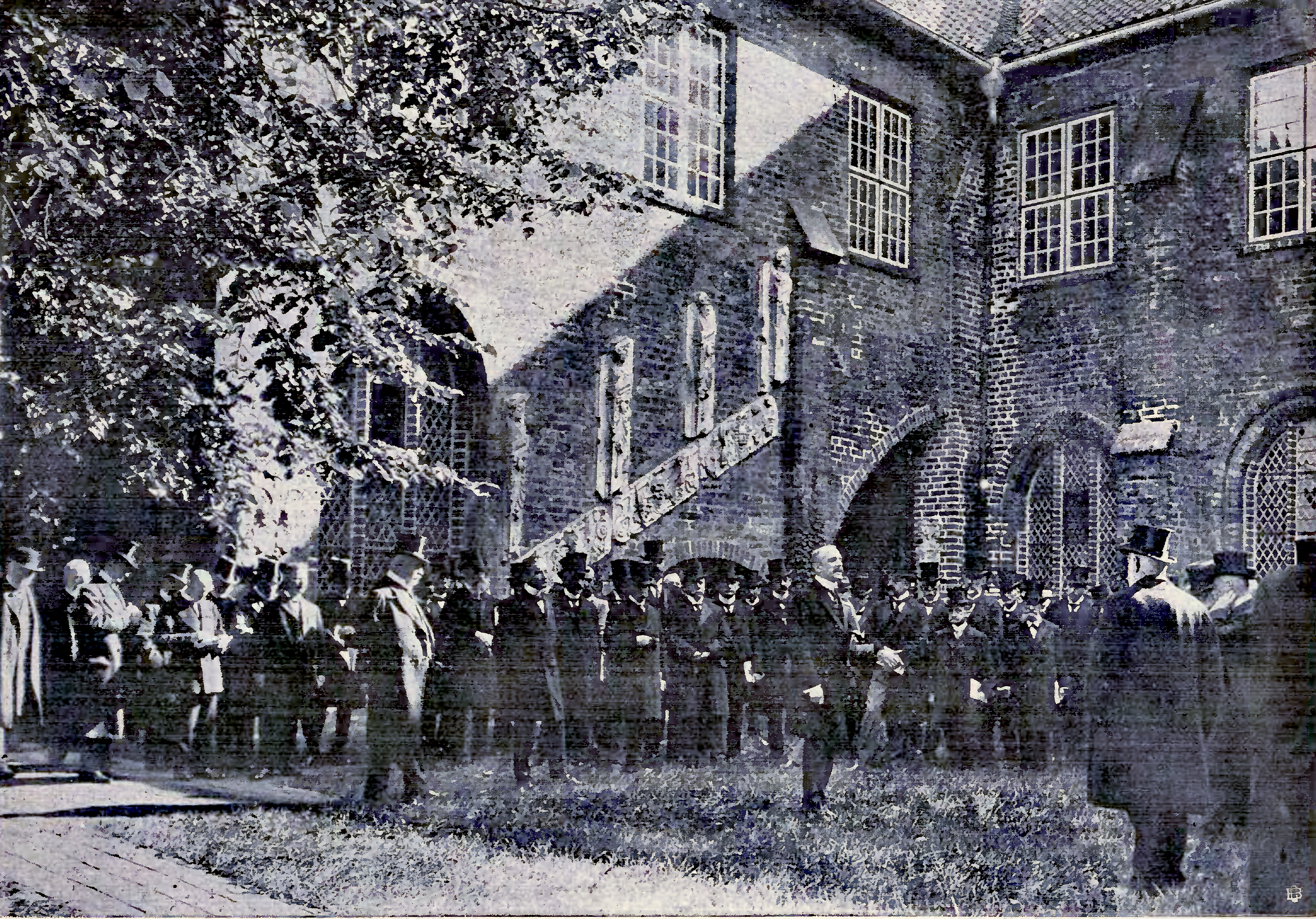
Opening speech (1915)

In 1912 the senate of Lübeck decided to convert the monastery into a museum. This caused changes of the ground plan in order to adapt the floorboards and wainscots of private town-houses. The opening of the museum took place in 1915 with some delay due to World War I. From 1920 to 1933, Carl Georg Heise managed the museum. In this era the acquisition of the Behnhaus and the assembly of its collection took place. in 1934 the museums of Lübeck were nationalized. Since 2013 St. Anne's museum and St. Anne's Kunsthalle are merchandized together as St. Anne's Museum Quarter together with a modern combined exhibition.

=== Collections ===
==== Sacred art of the Middle Ages ====
Thanks to an early decree of the senate for the preservation of Memorials of the Antiquity and Art (1818) and the resulting collecting policy of Carl Julius Milde in the 19th century, the museum houses the largest collection of medieval polyptychs (altarpieces) in Germany. It possesses the Grönauer Altar, the only preserved Gothic high altar of a church in Lübeck. The other altars kept here were mostly donated by guilds or merchants to monastery churches, e.g. to the church of the castle monastery or to the Saint Catherine Church. Among them are

- the altar of Saint Luke, by the painter Hermen Rode;
- the altar of the Traveller to Scania, by Bernt Notke;
- the altar of Saint Anthony, by Benedikt Dreyer;
- the altar of the Passion, by Hans Memling, originally donated to Lübeck Cathedral by the Greverade family; and finally
- a private altar, the triptych of the councillor Hinrich Kerckring, by Jacob van Utrecht, which found its adventurous way from the collection of Friedrich Wilhelm Brederlo in Riga to Lübeck.

Another outstanding piece is the Group of Saint George (1504), which was initially made for St. Jürgen's Chapel in the Ratzeburger Allee by the sculptor Henning von der Heide. The work of Hans Kemmer, a pupil of Cranach, embodies the changes of the Reformation and the Renaissance in Lübeck.

Besides the carved and painted objects, the museum also exhibits sculptures of the Romanesque and the Gothic periods, of which the most precious piece is the Madonna of Niendorf, made by Johannes Junge, which was found in 1926 in a barn in Niendorf in Moisling, Lübeck. Also remarkable is the Parable of the Ten Virgins, which was initially set up in the church of the castle monastery.

The Memling Altar in Lübeck

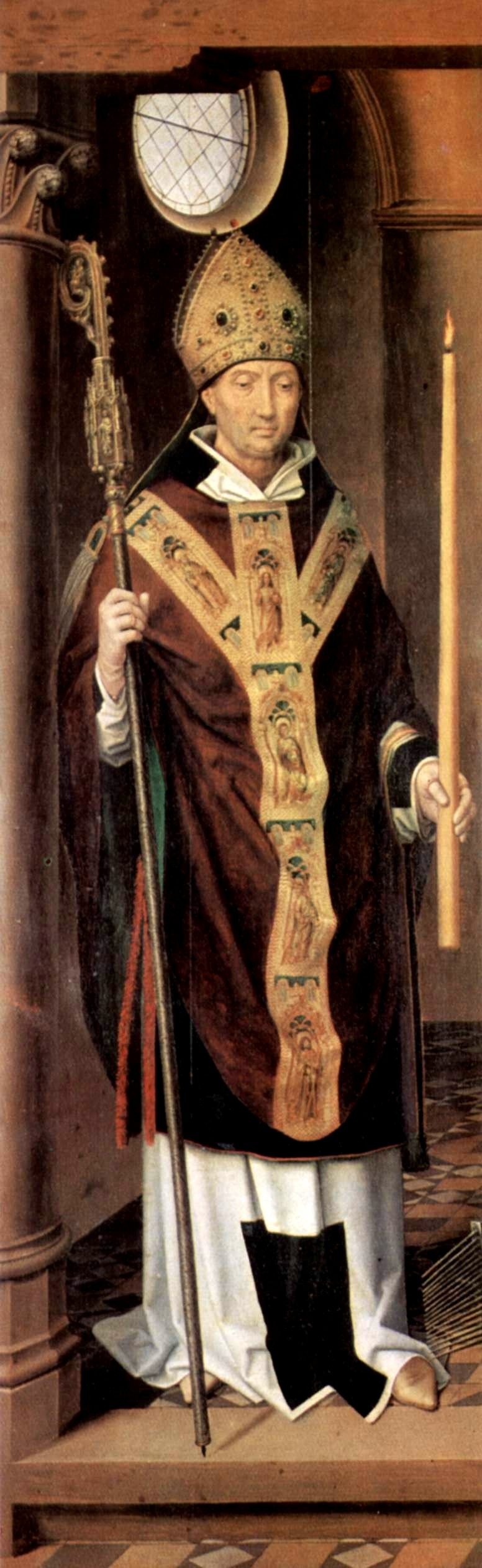

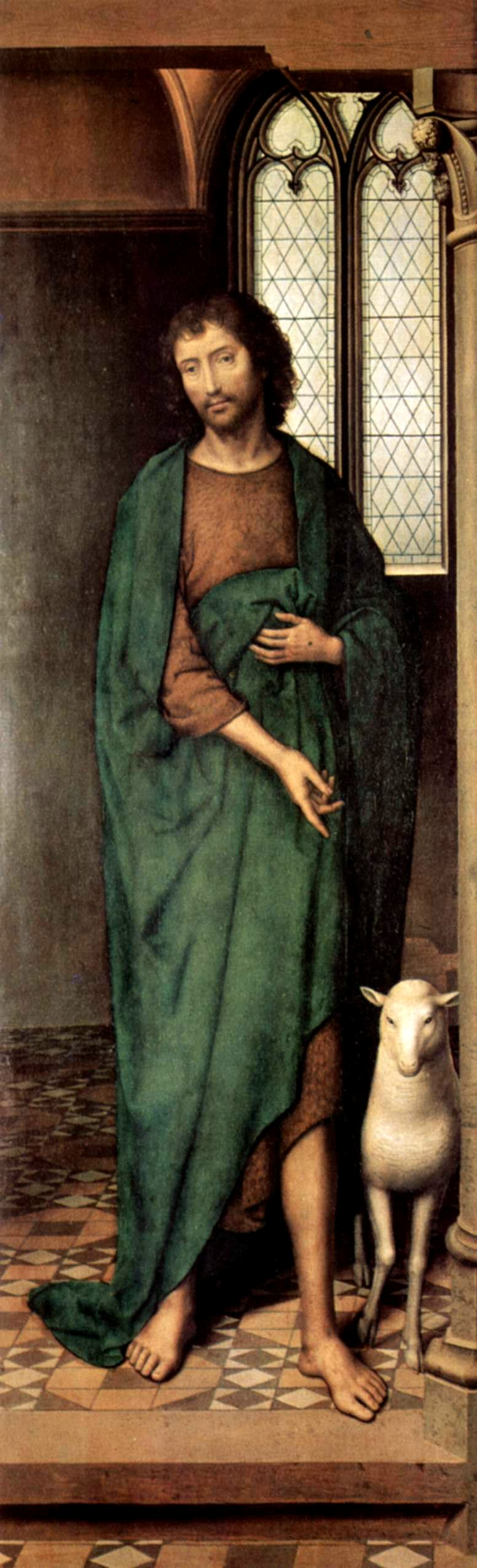

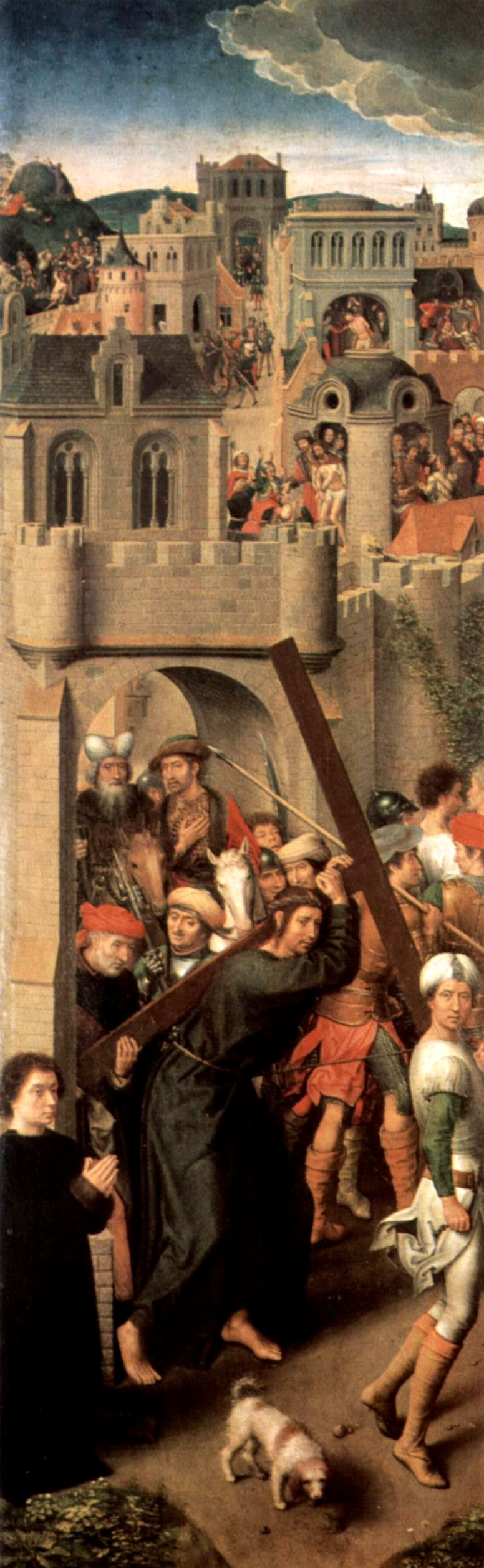

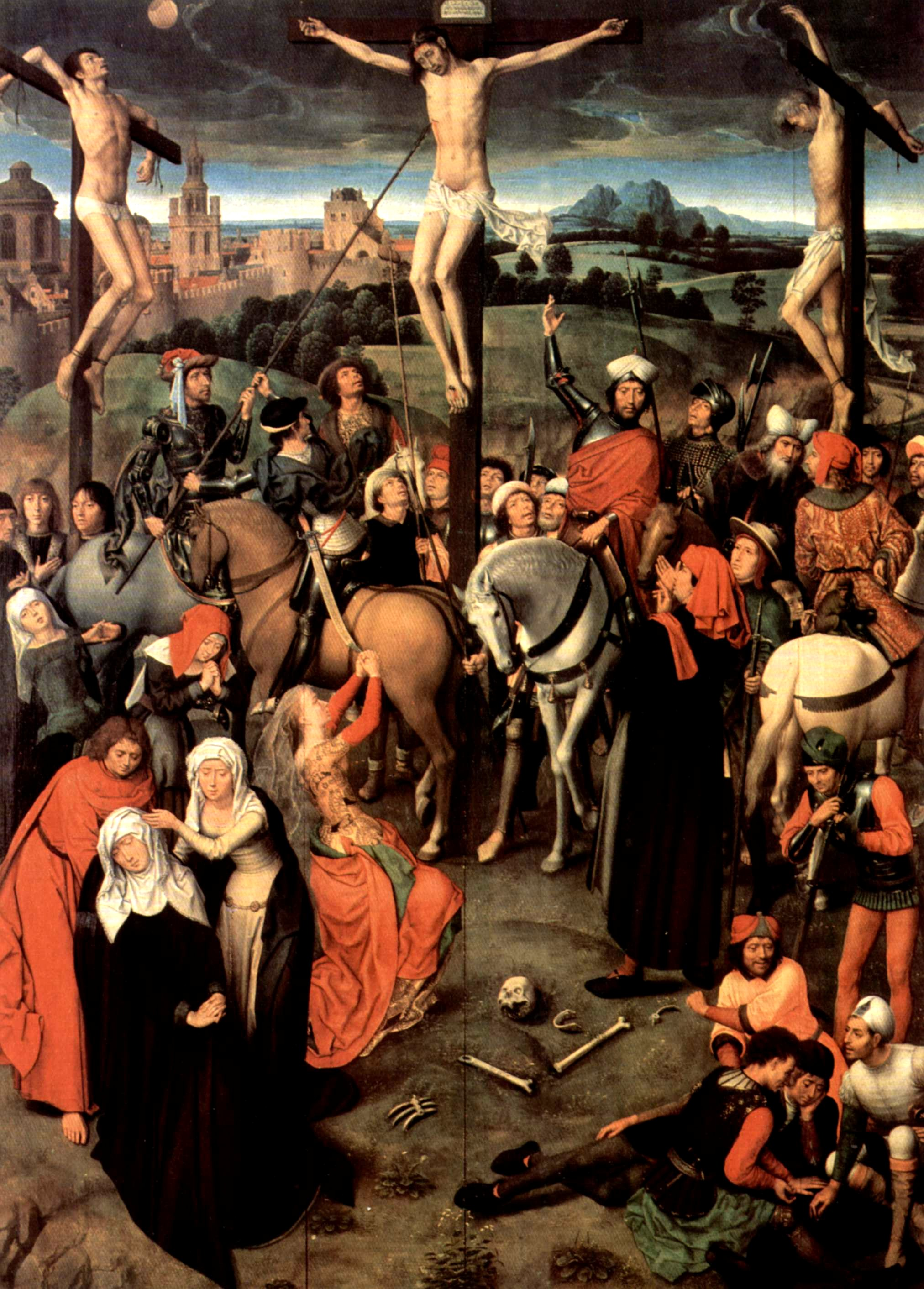
Mittelteil

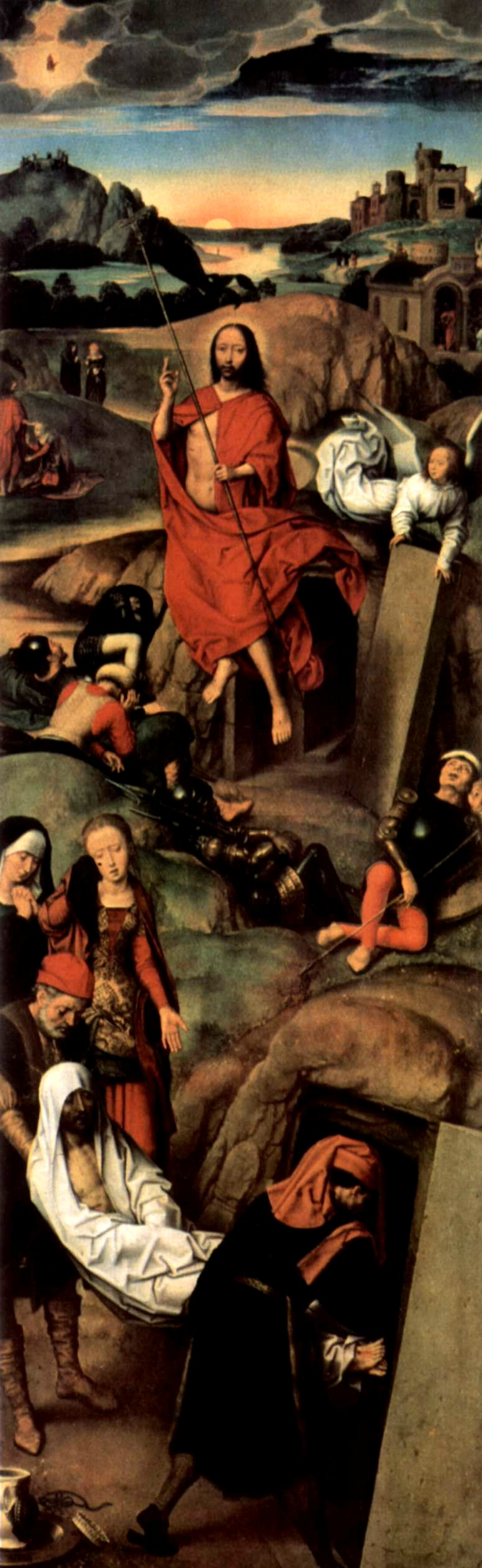

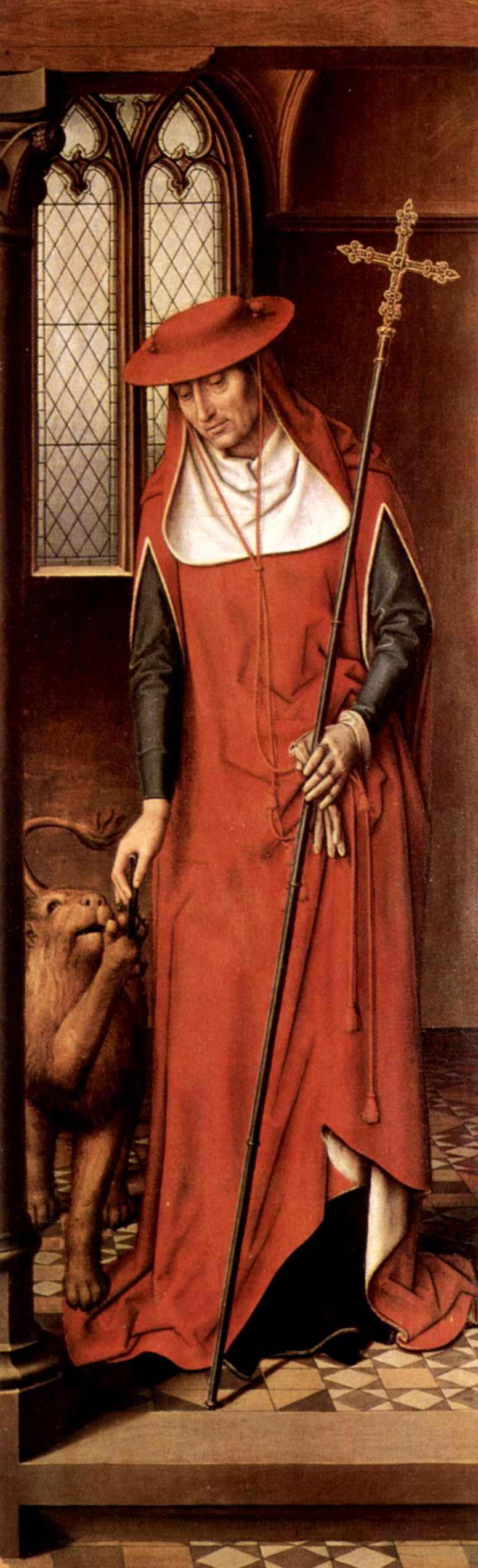

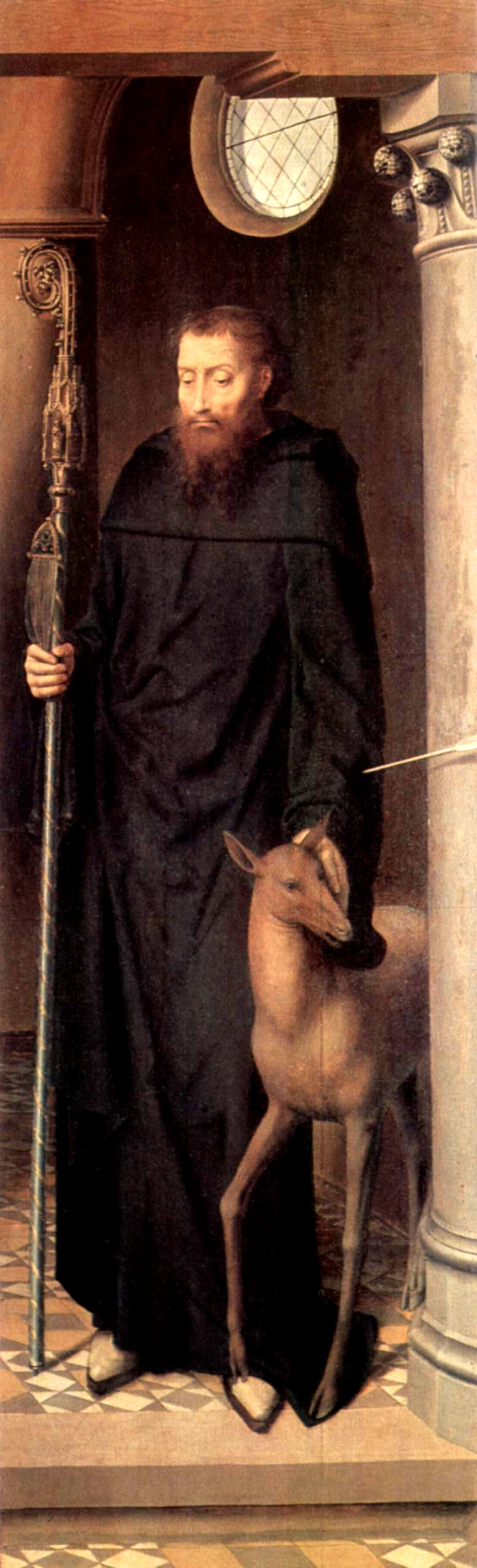

==== Council, guild, and church silverware ====
A special collection of representative cups, goblets, pots, utility objects and derivative pieces give praise to the high technical skills of Lübeck's gold and silversmiths and the wealth of their customers. The date of origin for these objects is generally presumed to be after the reformation, due to Lübeck's mayor Jürgen Wullenwever ordering the melting down of medieval silverware in order to finance the war against Denmark (Count's Feud).

==== Lübeck's home decor ====
The development of the middle-class home decor from the Renaissance to the Classicism can be seen in several rooms, which are partially made of Lübeck's private town-houses. In front of the background of contemporary art – amongst others by Godfrey Kneller and Thomas Quellinus, who made the bust of the councilman Thomas Fredenhagen in the baroque high altar of St. Mary's Church —, which reflects the taste of Lübeck's citizens, and the appropriate decor, made of porcelain by Fürstenberg and Meissen, one can well emphasize the depicted era. The greatest influence has a completely conserved baroque floorboard made in 1736. Annexed to this part of the exhibition is a special collection of Faience from Northern Germany in the upper floor, emphasizing the manufactures in Kellinghusen, Stockelsdorf, and Stralsund. Further, a collection of toys sheds light on past time activities of young Hanseatics. But the oldest hobby horse of the museum is within a group of children on the Altar der Gertrudenbrüderschaft der Träger (around 1509), which originates from the circle of Henning von der Heyde.

==== Chamber of paraments ====
Surely another area worth noting is the chamber of paraments, which exhibits old liturgical clothes of some of Lübeck's churches and the main part of the parament treasure of St. Mary's Church in Gdańsk.

==== Photo collection ====
Among the treasures that are not shown to the public is a collection of photographs. The collection was built up during the 1920s by Carl Georg Heise; included are approx. 450 artistic photos, among them are 212 photos by Albert Renger-Patzsch. It is the Collection Showing the History of Photography and the Collection of Ideal Photography. Both collections were not continued after Heise's resignation in 1933 and fell in oblivion for a long time. A few years ago they were brought back into circulation, because the Collection of Ideal Photography is the most comprehensive collection of photographs of the New Objectivity in German (amongst others are works are opus by Renger-Patzsch, Hugo Erfurth, Umbo, and Robert Petschow).

== St. Anne's Kunsthalle ==
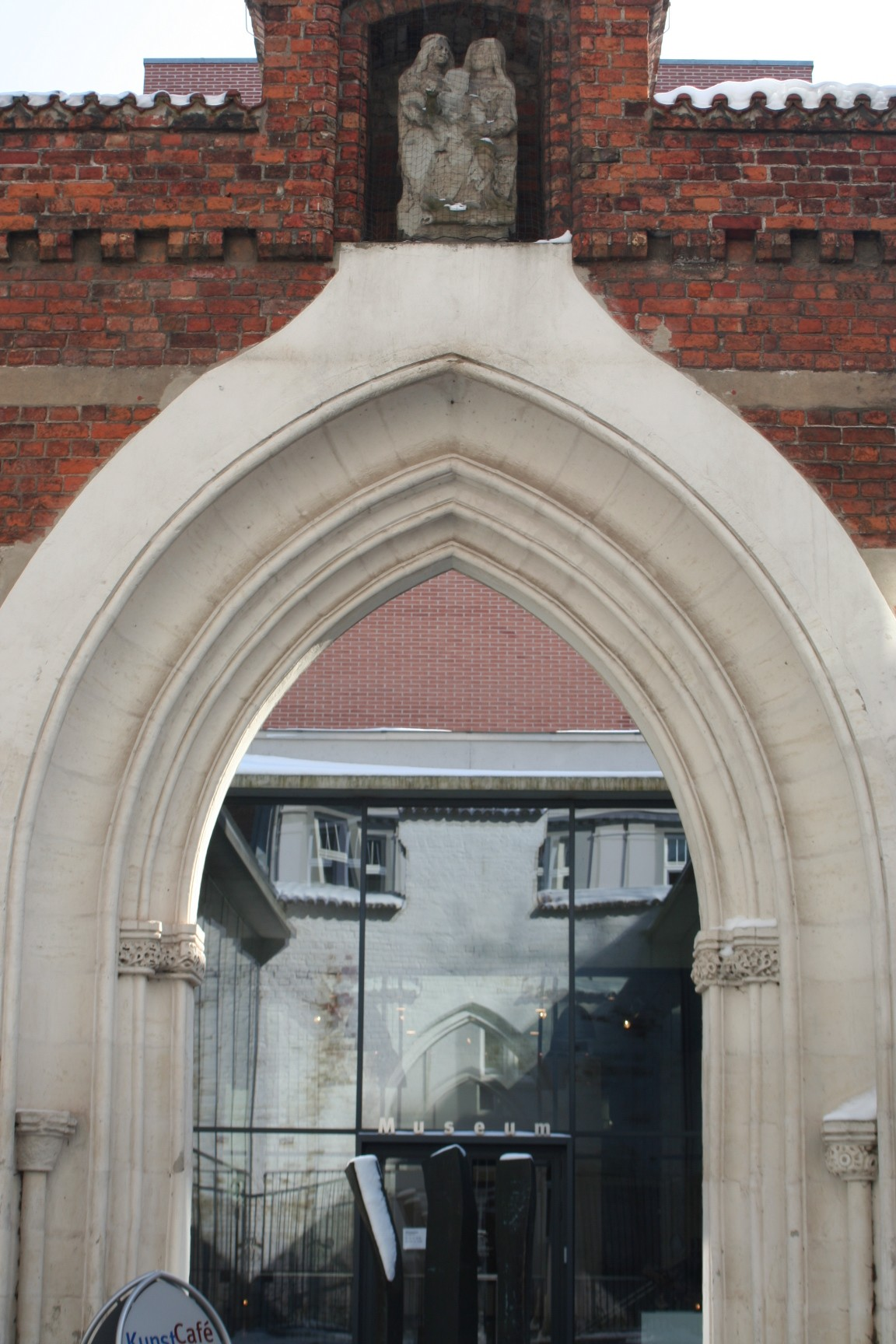
Entrance of the Kunsthalle

Besides the St. Anne's Museum the monastery also contains the St. Anne's Kunsthalle. The architecture of the Kunsthalle, which was built modernly in 2004 and has the ruins of the former church and the monastery that burnt down in 1843, was a gift of the Possehl Foundation. In 2003 the architecture of the Kunsthalle, which was planned by the architects Konermann Siegmund from Hamburg/Lübeck, received the quadrennial star prize of the Bund Deutscher Architekten (Federation of German Architects) of Schleswig-Holstein. The Kunsthalle exhibits modern art of the 20th century.

=== Emphasis on self-portraits of modernity ===
In September 2005, through the medium of Björn Engholm, the Kunsthalle St. Annen received the inimitable collection of Leonie von Rüxleben (1920 – 21 September 2005). This collection is the largest of its type in Germany. This collection enables the Kunsthalle to show approx. 1300 self-portraits of modernity in different exhibitions. But recently there appeared a conflict between the heirs of von Rüxleben and the museum's administration concerning the management of the inheritance.

=== Exhibitions ===
- Exil und Moderne (Exile and Modernity): 50 classical exhibits of classical modernity from the collection of the Washington University in St. Louis, 4 September 2005 and 29 January 2006.

== Bibliography ==
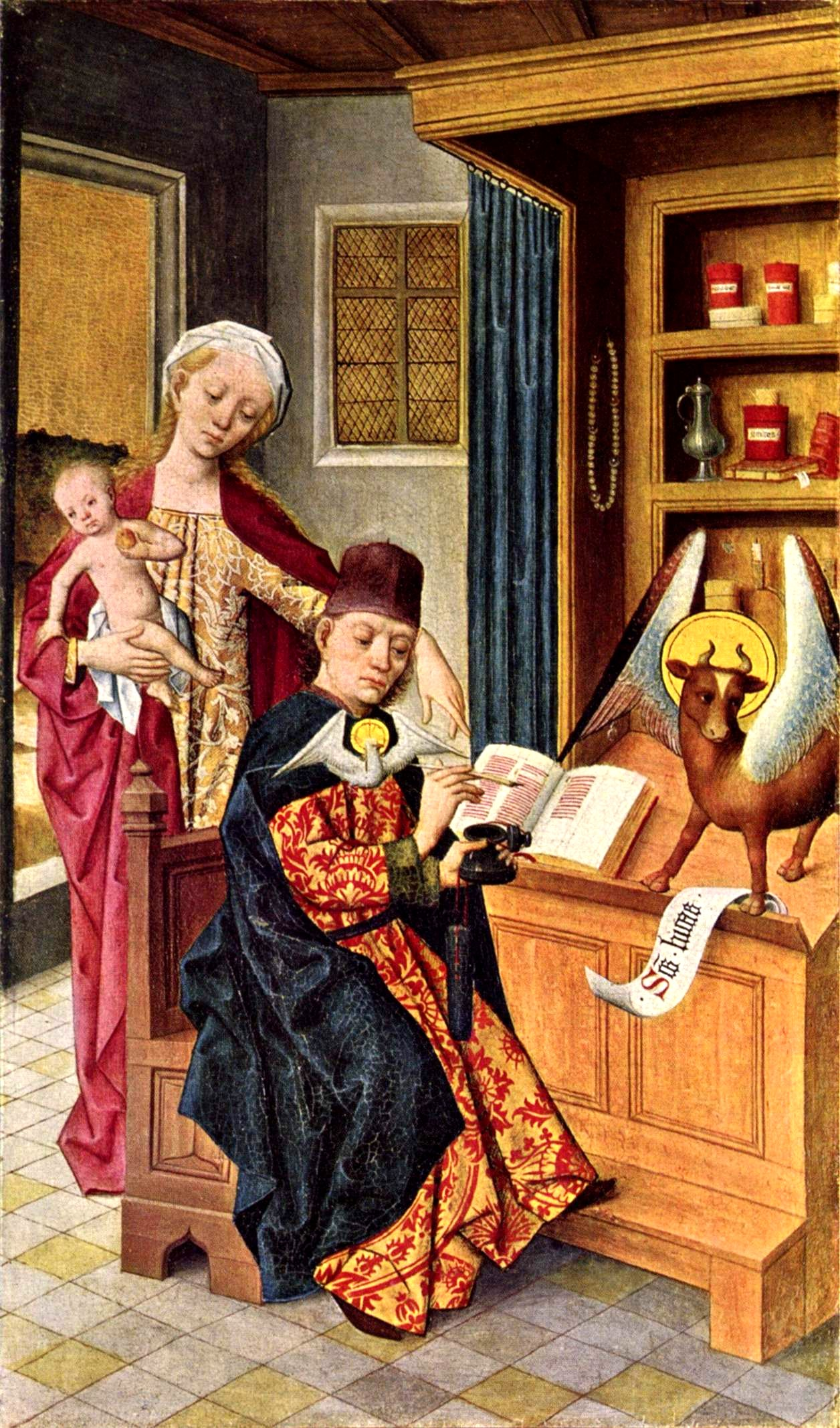
Rode's Altar of Luke

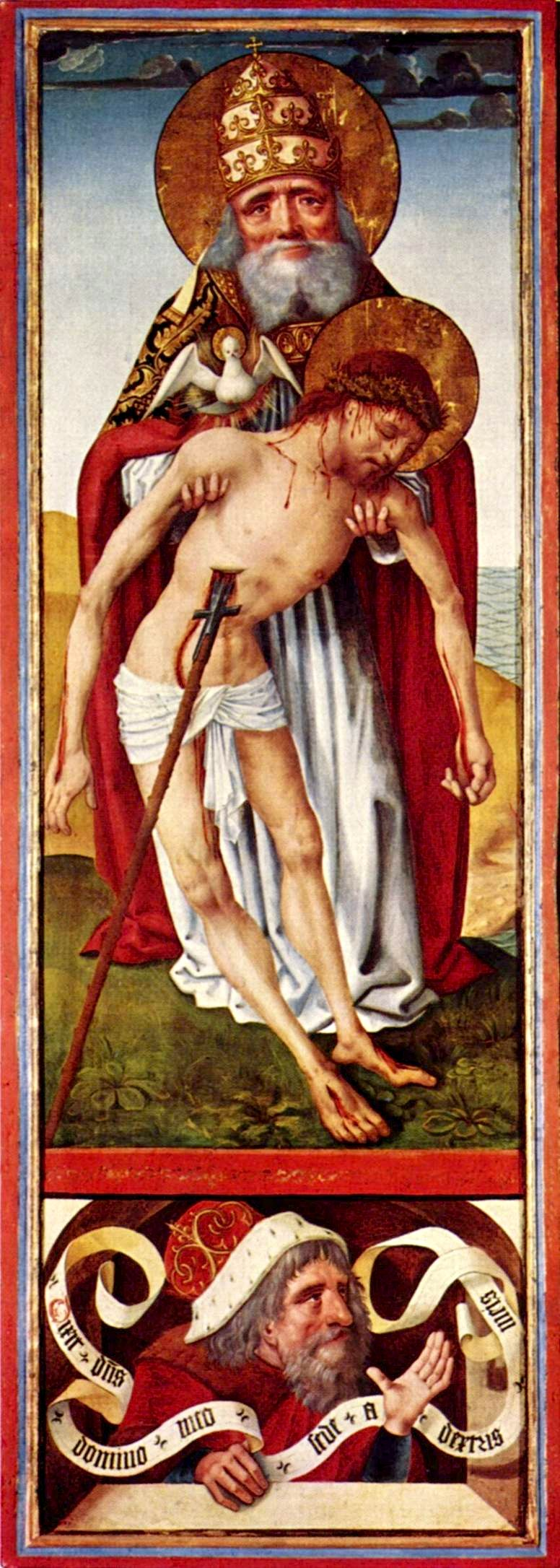
Notke's Altar of the traveller to Scania

- Karl Schaefer, Führer durch das Museum für Kunst- und Kulturgeschichte zu Lübeck, 1915
- Max Hasse, Der Lübecker Passionsaltar Hans Memlings als Denkmal mittelalterlicher Frömmigkeit in: Vom Lübecker Dom, Lübeck 1958, p. 33 ff
- Wolfgang J. Müller, Lübeck um 1250 – Kunsthistorische Betrachtungen zum neuen Stadtmodell in: Politik, Wirtschaft und Kunst des staufischen Lübeck, Lübeck 1976, p. 51 ff
- Jürgen Wittstock [Ed.], Kirchliche Kunst des Mittelalters und der Reformationszeit: die Sammlung im St.-Annen-Museum (Museum catalogues of Lübeck, Vol. 1). Lübeck: Museum für Kunst u. Kulturgeschichte, 1981, ISBN 3-9800517-0-6
- Hildegard Vogler, Madonnen in Lübeck, Museum für Kunst und Kulturgeschichte, Lübeck 1993
- Die neue Sicht der Dinge. Carl Georg Heise's collection of photographs from the 1920s. Catalogue of the exhibition 1995, published by the Hamburger Kunsthalle and the Museum für Kunst und Kulturgeschichte of the Hanseatic city Lübeck.
- Anna Elisabeth Albrecht: Steinskulptur in Lübeck um 1400: Stiftung und Herkunft. Reimer: Berlin 1997. ISBN 3-496-01172-6
- Hildegard Vogler, Das Triptychon des Hinrich und der Katharina Kerckring von Jacob van Utrecht, Museum für Kunst und Kulturgeschichte, Lübeck 1999
- Ulrich Pietsch, Die Lübecker Seeschiffahrt vom Mittelalter zur Neuzeit, Lübeck 1982, ISBN 3-9800517-1-4 (exhibition catalogue)
- Thorsten Rodiek, Kunsthalle St. Annen in Lübeck Ed. Herbert Perl, Junius Verlag Hamburg 2003, ISBN 3-88506-537-1
- Uwe Albrecht, Jörg Rosenfeld, and Christiane Saumweber: Corpus der Mittelalterlichen Holzskulptur und Tafelmalerei in Schleswig-Holstein, Band I: Hansestadt Lübeck, St. Annen-Museum. Kiel: Ludwig, 2005. ISBN 3-933598-75-3
