= Die Welt ist schön =

1928 book by Albert Renger-Patzsch

- Cover of first edition, depicting the photographer's initials, a telegraph mast, and an agave plant
- Author: Albert Renger-Patzsch
- Language: German
- Genre: Photobook
- Publisher: Kurt Wolff
- Publication date: 1928
- Publication place: Germany
- Media type: Print (Hardcover)
- LC Class: TR 650.R4

Die Welt ist schön (German pronunciation: [diː ˈvɛlt ɪst ˈʃøːn], The World is Beautiful) is a 1928 book of photography by German photographer Albert Renger-Patzsch. A popular work at the time, Die Welt ist schön is generally considered one of the most important books of photography published in the Weimar Republic, and as an iconic example of the photography of New Objectivity. Renger-Patzsch's book provoked emphatic reactions upon release: while contemporaries such as Ernst Toller and Thomas Mann praised Die Welt ist schön. It was sharply criticized by figures like Walter Benjamin, and Bertolt Brecht, who felt that Renger-Patzsch's work was too beholden to a naive idea of photographic realism and ended up aestheticizing everything, thus obscuring social realities.
