= Friedrich Winkler =

German art historian

Friedrich Horst Winkler
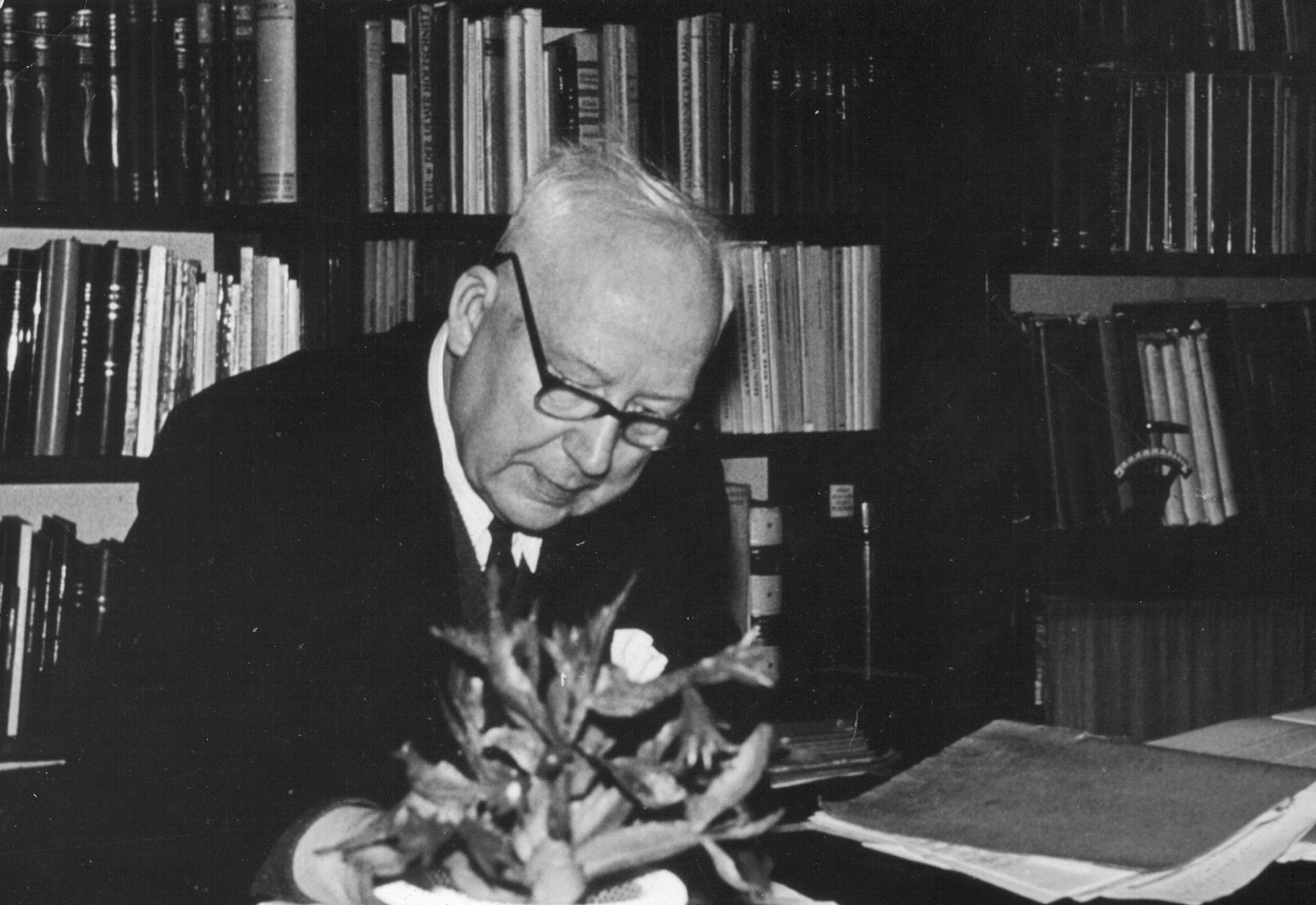
- Born: March 5, 1888
- Died: February 23, 1965 (aged 76)

Academic work
- Discipline: History of art
- Institutions: Humboldt University of Berlin; Free University of Berlin

Friedrich Horst Winkler (5 March 1888 – 23 February 1965) was a German art historian specialised in German art, especially the works of Albrecht Dürer, and Early Netherlandish painting from the 15th and 16th century.

== Biography ==
Friedrich Winkler was born at his family's farm in Prehna, a hamlet of Lumpzig, Germany, in 1888. He studied art history at the University of Vienna, the University of Berlin, and the University of Freiburg, where he studied under Wilhelm Vöge. His thesis Der Meister von Flemalle und Rogier van der Weyden, written in 1912, was published in 1913.

He then started working as the editor of the Lexikon der bildenden Künstler by Ulrich Thieme and Felix Becker, for which he wrote 34 entries. He also worked as a volunteer at the Gemäldegalerie Alte Meister in Dresden, but then joined the army during World War I. He left the army in 1915 to become the director of the Kunstbibliothek Berlin. he wrote a work on Early Netherlandish miniatures, and in 1924 reworked Die Altniederländisch Malerei von 1400–1600, originally written by Max Jacob Friedländer. In 1925 appeared Die Flämische Buchmalerei, about Flemish miniature painting. In this period he married Hermina Christina Schützinger.

Winkler then started working on the catalogue raisonné of the drawings by Albrecht Dürer, which was started by Friedrich Lippmann (1838–1903). Winkler wrote the final two volumes of the catalog and a book about Dürer, which were published in the late 1920s. In 1933 he succeeded the deceased Elfried Bock as head of the Kupferstichkabinett Berlin. Between 1936 and 1939 he published a new catalogue of the drawings of Dürer in 4 volumes.

In 1942 he published a work on the drawings of Hans von Kulmbach and Hans Leonhard Schäufelein, both pupils of Dürer. In 1947 he became a lecturer at the Humboldt University of Berlin and in 1951 he switched to Western Germany and the Free University of Berlin, until he retired in 1957. That year he wrote Leben und Werke, a biography of Dürer. After another work on Hans von Kulmbach, he published his final major work in 1964, Das Werk des Hugo van der Goes. In 1950 he was made a corresponding member of the Bavarian Academy of Sciences and Humanities.

A heart attack late in 1964 led to his death in February 1965.

== Bibliography ==
- 1913: Der Meister von Flemalle und Rogier van der Weyden
- 1913-1914: Lexikon der bildenden Künstler (editor and writer)
- 1915: a study of Early Netherlandish miniatures
- 1924: Die Altniederländisch Malerei von 1400-1600 (originally written by Max Jacob Friedländer), in the Propyläen Kunstgeschichte series
- 1925: Die Flämische Buchmalerei des 15. und 16. Jahrhunderts
- 1927-1929: Zeichnungen von Albrecht Dürer in Nachbildungen, volume 6 and 7
- 1928: Monograph about Dürer
- 1936-1939: Drawings of Dürer, a catalogue in 4 volumes
- 1939: Altdeutschen Meisterzeichnungen aus der Sammlung Ehlers im Berliner Kupferstichkabinett
- 1942: Monograph about the drawings of Hans von Kulmbach and Hans Leonhard Schäufelein
- 1951: Dürer und die Illustrationen zum Narrenschiff
- 1957: Leben und Werke
- 1950s-1960s: Monograph on Hans von Kulmbach
- 1964: Das Werk des Hugo van der Goes
