= Wilhelm Waetzoldt =

German art historian (1880–1945)

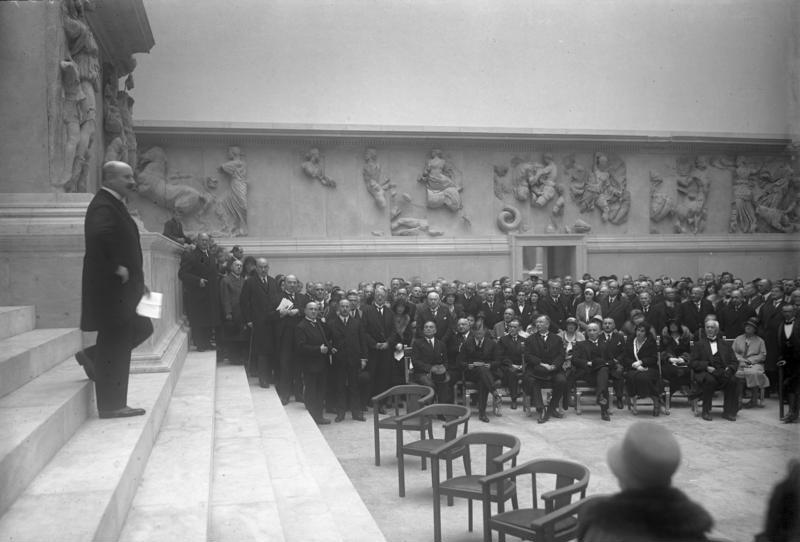
Wilhelm Waetzoldt gives the opening speech at the inauguration of the Pergamon Museum (1930)

Wilhelm Waetzoldt (21 February 1880 in Hamburg – 5 January 1945 in Halle (Saale) was a German art historian, professor of art history in Halle, Geheimer Oberregierungsrat in the Prussian Ministry of Culture and from 1927 to 1933 general director of the Berlin State Museums.

== Life ==
Waetzoldt's father was the philologist and pedagogue Stephan Waetzoldt (1849–1904). He was educated at different schools in Berlin, Magdeburg and Hamburg. In 1899, he passed his Abitur at the Kloster Unser Lieben Frauen in Magdeburg.

He then began studying art history, philosophy and literary history in Berlin and Magdeburg. He finished his studies in 1903 with a dissertation on Friedrich Hebbel. From 1908 to 1909, Waetzoldt worked as an assistant at the Kunsthistorisches Institut in Florenz. The knowledge and impressions gained in Italy were reflected in later publications. He took positions at the Warburg Institute (1909–1911) and the National Museums in Berlin (1911–1912). In 1912, he was appointed professor of modern art history at the Martin Luther University Halle-Wittenberg. During World War I, Waetzoldt served on the Western Front in the rank of a lieutenant and took part in the Battle of Soissons. He was wounded twice and was awarded the Iron Cross II classe. In 1916, due to his war wound, he was transferred to the Landwehr and was able to continue his teaching activities in Halle.

In 1920 Waetzoldt was appointed Lecturer Councillor in the Preußisches Ministerium der geistlichen, Unterrichts- und Medizinalangelegenheiten and in 1927 he was finally appointed General Director of the Staatliche Museen Berlin. During his term of office the new building of the Pergamonmuseums. In 1929 he was appointed Senator of the Prussian Academy of Arts. He was also an honorary professor at the University of Berlin. With the Machtergreifung by the Nazis in 1933 he was removed from office. He was charged with financial irregularities, the promotion of modern art and the support and employment of Jews. His successor was Otto Kümmel. Waetzoldt was able to dispel the accusation of financial irregularities. He rejected in vain the responsibility for the Nationalgalerie's acquisition policy, in particular the acquisition of paintings by Emil Nolde. Waetzoldt was later offered the opportunity to regain his posts in connection with his entry into the Nazi Party, which he refused. However, in September 1933 he became a member of the National Socialist Motor Corps.

Against the will of the Rectorate of the University of Halle, Waetzoldt was appointed Full Professor of Art History at the Faculty of Philosophy in 1934, where he also served as Provisional Dean of the Faculty of Philosophy from 1938 to 1940.

Waetzoldt was the father of the art historian Stephan Waetzoldt (1920–2008) and the military historian Ursula von Gersdorff (née Waetzoldt, also countess Vitzthum von Eckstädt, 1910–1983).

== Publications ==
See the bibliography in Deutschland – Italien. Festschrift für Wilhelm Waetzoldt zu seinem 60. Geburtstage, 21. Februar 1940. G. Grote, Berlin 1941, pp. xx–xxxvi.

- Das Kunstwerk als Organismus (1905)
- Die Kunst des Porträts (1908)
- Einführung in die bildenden Künste. 2 volumes (1911)
- Bildnisse deutscher Kunsthistoriker. E. A. Seemann, Leipzig 1921 (Bibliothek der Kunstgeschichte 14)
- Deutsche Kunsthistoriker. 2 volumes, E. A. Seemann, Leipzig 1921/24 (Numerized volume 1, Vol.2)
- Dürer und seine Zeit. Phaidon Verlag, Vienna 1935; Büchergilde Gutenberg, Frankfurt 1956
- Dürers Ritter, Tod und Teufel (1936)
- Du und die Kunst. Eine Einführung in Kunstbetrachtung und Kunstgeschichte (1938)
- Hans Holbein der Jüngere. Werk und Welt. G. Grothe, Berlin (1938)
- Burckhardt als Kunsthistoriker (1940)
- Deutsche Kunstwerke: beschrieben von deutschen Dichtern (Sammlung Dieterich 96). Dieterich, Leipzig 1940.
- Italienische Kunstwerke in Meisterbeschreibungen (Sammlung Dieterich 105) Dieterich, Leipzig 1942.
- Niccolò Machiavelli. Bruckmann, München 1943.
- Schöpferische Phantasie: Essais und Glossen (Sammlung Dieterich 11). Dieterich, Wiesbaden 1947.
