= Bertha Badt-Strauss =

German writer and Zionist (1885–1970)

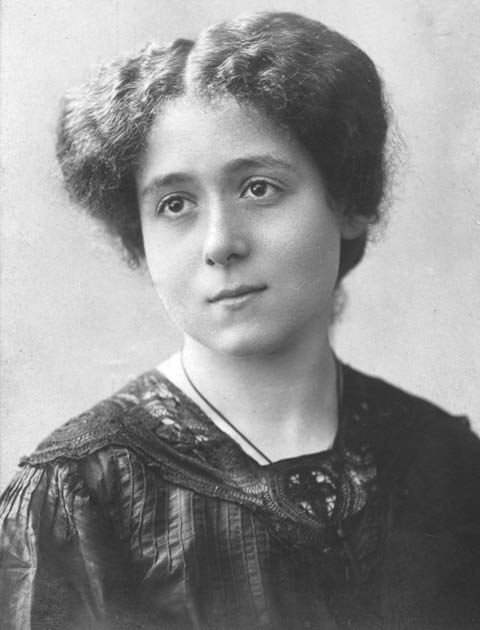
- Bertha Badt-Strauss circa 1910
- Born: 7 December 1885; Breslau
- Died: 28 February 1970 (aged 84); Chapel Hill, North Carolina
- Writing career
- Genres: non-fiction translation biography

Bertha Badt-Strauss (7 December 1885 – 20 February 1970) was a German writer and Zionist. She wrote for numerous Jewish publications in Berlin and the United States, and edited and translated the works of many other writers.

== Biography ==
Bertha Badt was born in 1885 in Breslau to Benno Badt, a philologist, and Martha (née Guttman), a teacher. She studied literature and philosophy in Breslau, Berlin and Munich, and with her thesis on Annette von Droste-Hülshoff, became one of the first women in Prussia to receive a doctoral degree. She lived in Berlin with her husband Bruno Strauss, an educator, from 1913, and their son Albrecht was born in 1921. Shortly after Albrecht's birth, Bertha developed multiple sclerosis.

Badt-Strauss was a Zionist and an active member of the Jewish community in Berlin. She wrote articles for a variety of Jewish newspapers, including Jüdische Rundschau, Der Jude, Israelitische Familienblatt, Blätter des Jüdischen Frauenbundes and Der Morgen, and contributed to two Jewish encyclopedias, Encyclopaedia Judaica and Jüdisches Lexikon. She was also a prolific editor and translator of works by other writers, including Droste-Hülshoff, Achim von Arnim, Moses Mendelssohn, Fanny Lewald, Hermann Cohen, Rahel Varnhagen, Heinrich Heine, Süßkind von Trimberg, Profiat Duran and Leon of Modena. She wrote a book-length unpublished biography of German writer Elise Reimarus.

Badt-Strauss migrated from Nazi Germany to the United States in 1939. She settled in Shreveport, Louisiana, where her husband was a professor at Centenary College of Louisiana. She published a biography of the Zionist Jessie Sampter titled White Fire: The Life and Works of Jessie Sampter, and continued to write for a variety of Jewish-American publications: Aufbau, The Jewish Way, The Menorah Journal, The Reconstructionist, The National Jewish Monthly, Hadassah Newsletter and Women's League Outlook. She died in 1970 in Chapel Hill, North Carolina.
