= Hubert Janitschek =

Austrian-German art historian (1846–1893)

Hubert Janitschek, 1846-1893

Hubert Janitschek (30 October 1846 – 21 June 1893) was an Austrian-German art historian. Janitschek was born in Troppau, Silesia.

From 1868 to 1873 he studied history and philosophy at the University of Graz, followed by several years study of art history in Italy (1873–77). From 1877 to 1879 he worked in the Museum für angewandte Kunst in Vienna, and in the meantime obtained his habilitation at the University of Vienna (1878). Successively, he was a professor of art history at the universities of Prague (from 1879), Strasbourg (from 1881) and Leipzig (from 1891).

In 1890 he created the terms "Ottonian art" and "Ottonian painting". Among his students were Georg Dehio, Aby Warburg, Paul Clemen and Wilhelm Vöge. In 1882 he married the writer Maria Tölk (1859–1927). He died in 1893 in Leipzig.

== Select writings ==
- Leone Battista Albertis kleinere kunsttheoretische Schriften. Vienna: W. Braumüller, 1877.
- Die Gesellschaft der Renaissance in Italien und die Kunst. Stuttgart: W. Spemann, 1879.
- "Zwei Studien zur Geschichte der karolingischen Malerei." In Strassburger Festgruss an Anton Springer zum 4. Mai 1885. Stuttgart: Spemann, 1885, pp. 1–30.
- Die Geschichte der deutschen Malerei. 5 vols. Berlin: Grote, 1887-1890.
- Die Kunstlehre Dantes and Giottos Kunst. Leipzig: Brockhaus, 1892.
