= Maria Janitschek =

German writer

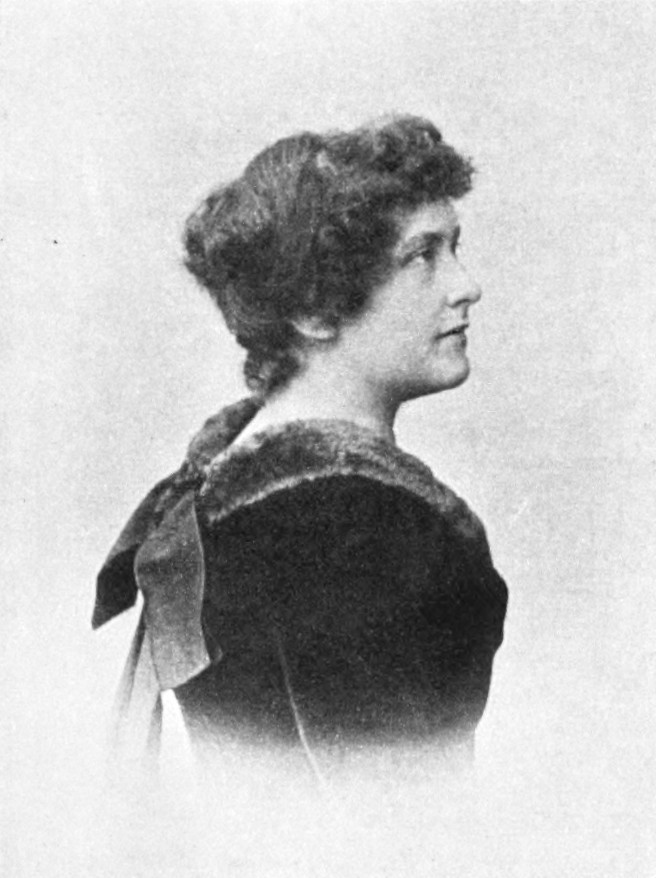
- Maria Janitschek in 1907
- Born: July 22, 1859
- Died: April 28, 1927 (aged 67)
- Spouse: Hubert Janitschek
- Writing career
- Pen name: Marius Stein
- Genre: Poetry

Maria Janitschek née Tölk (July 22, 1859 in Mödling (near Vienna) - April 28, 1927 in Munich) was a German writer of Austrian origin. She wrote under the pseudonym of Marius Stein.

== Life ==
Born the illegitimate child of a military officer, she was raised by her mother Anna Tölk in impoverished circumstances and educated in a Hungarian convent school. When she was 19, she moved with her mother to Graz where she published her first articles as a journalist under the pseudonym Marius Stein. The newspapers Moderne Dichtung and Wiener Rundschau numbered among her employers. At age 23 she married Hubert Janitschek, a professor of art history. The couple lived in Strassburg and Leipzig. Her husband died in 1893 and Maria moved to Berlin and later to Munich.

== Work ==
Her first published books were collections of poetry and short stories. These appealed to the interests of the bourgeois women's movement in the topics of their works: the problems of marriage and love for women, treated in a manner that at the time was very liberal. In 1889 she published her first volume of poems Irdische und unirdische Träume (Earthly and Unearthly Dreams), which included the highly criticized poem "Ein modernes Weib" (A Modern Wife). Germany banned her short story collection Die neue Eva in 1909. She considered Émile Zola, Henrik Ibsen, and Leo Tolstoy to be her role models. Her works often have strong female characters who become merciless avengers when wrongs are done to them. In her epic works, she explored the dualism between the sensible and the emotional side of people.

== Selected writings ==
- Legenden und Geschichten, ? 1885
- Irdische und unirdische Träume, ? 1889
- Atlas, Novella, Berlin 1893
- Buch der Freiheit, Anthology, Ed Karl Henckell (later included in Texte von Maria Janitschek), Berlin 1893
- Im Sommerwind, poem, Leipzig 1895
- Ninive, Novel, Leipzig 1896
- Vom Weibe - Charakterzeichnungen, Berlin 1896
- Der Schleifstein - ein Lebensbild, Leipzig 1896
- Sonnenblumen, Anthology, Ed. Karl Henckell (later included in Texte von Maria Janitschek), Stuttgart 1896
- Gelandet, Leipzig 1897
- Kreuzfahrer, Short Story, Leipzig 1897
- Die Amazonenschlacht, Novel, Leipzig 1897
- Ueberm Thal in: Nord und Süd - Eine deutsche Monatsschrift, Ed. Paul Lindau, Breslau 1898, Vol. 84
- Frauenkraft Novellen, Berlin 1900
- Vom Weibe - Charakterzeichnungen, Berlin 1901
- Auf weiten Flügeln, Novellas, Leipzig 1902
- Die neue Eva, Novellas, Leipzig/Berlin 1902
- Maiblumen, (Aus Aproditens Garten #1), Leipzig 1902
- Feuerlilie, (Aus Aproditens Garten #2), Leipzig 1902
- Pfingstsonne, Novella, Breslau 1903
- Mimikry - Ein Stück modernes Leben, Novel, Leipzig 1903
- Esclarmonde - Ihr Lieben und Leiden, Stuttgart 1906
- Eine Liebesnacht, Novel, ? 1908
- Lustige Ehen - eine Geschichte, in der sich alle kriegen, Leipzig 1910
- Olympier überm Tal, Two Novellas, (Deutsche Volkskultur in Wort, Bild und Klang #5) Berlin ca. 1910
- Die Sterne des Herrn Ezelin, Novel, Leipzig 1915
- Der rote Teufel, Novel, Leipzig 1916
- Wildes Blut, Berlin 1916
- Im Finstern, Novel, Leipzig ca. 1920
- Kinder der Puszta, Novel, ? 1920
- Saat und Ernte - Die deutsche Lyrik um 1925, in Selbstauswahlen der Dichter und Dichterinnen (Maria Janitschek), mit kurzen Eigenbiographien und Angabe ihrer Werke, Ed. Albert Sergel, Berlin/Vienna 1924

== Bibliography ==
- Petra Budke and Jutta Schulze: Schriftstellerinnen in Berlin 1871 - 1945. Ein Lexikon zu Leben und Werk. Orlanda Frauenverlag, Berlin 1995, ISBN 3-929823-22-5.
- Theresia Klugsberger and Sigrid Schmid-Bortenschlager: Wider die Eindeutigkeit. Maria Janitschek. In: Karin Tebben (Ed): Deutschsprachige Schriftstellerinnen des Fin de siècle. Diss. Buchgesellschaft, Darmstadt 1999, ISBN 3-534-14484-8, P. 181-196.
