= Janíček =

Janíček (feminine:: Janíčková) is a Czech and Slovak surname. It is also a diminutive of the given name Jan. Notable people with this surname include:

- Barbora Janíčková (born 2000), Czech swimmer
- Josef Janíček (born 1947), Czech musician
- Lexi Janicek (born 2011), American actress
- Richard Janíček (died 2007), Czech motorcycle speedway
- Miroslav Janíček (born 1974), Slovak weightlifter
- Tomáš Janíček (born 1982), Czech football player
- In Polish folklore Juraj Jánošík is known as Janicek / Janiczek
