= Kurt Badt =

German art historian

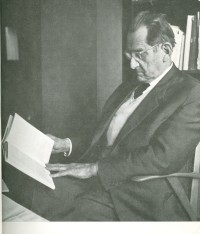
Kurt Badt sitting at his desk

Kurt Badt (3 March 1890 in Berlin − 22 November 1973 in Überlingen) was a German art historian.

== Life and work ==
The son of a Berlin banker, Badt studied art history and philosophy first at the Friedrich Wilhelm University of Berlin and the Ludwig-Maximilians-Universität München and then at the University of Freiburg, where he was a student of Wilhelm Vöge. Among his fellow students was the young Erwin Panofsky. Badt completed his doctoral dissertation on Andrea Solario in 1914. He started his career as an assistant at the Kunsthalle Bremen, but most of his life he was an independent scholar teaching privately, as his family was wealthy, and he did not need an academic job in order to earn a living. According to Alfons Rosenberg, he lived the life of a Renaissance humanist. In 1939, he left Germany gaining a research position at the newly founded Warburg Institute in London. He returned to Germany in 1950, where he became a German citizen in 1952 and helped to reorganize the university system. His writings include studies on Wilhelm Lehmbruck, Eugène Delacroix, Nicolas Poussin, Jan Vermeer, John Constable, Paul Cézanne, Raphael, Vincent van Gogh, Paolo Veronese, Ernst Barlach and attacks on the methodology of the "second Vienna school" of art history dominated by Hans Sedlmayr. He considered "masterpieces" to be the only works of art worth studying.

Badt radically separated works of art from the deeds in history: the first are what artists have in mind, their works interest and currently attract the viewer as such, whereas the historical deeds intend effects and are related to their consequences and therefore tend to be absorbed by them. Furthermore, Badt explained his new fundamental approach to interpretation with the difference between historical action and artistic making: he differentiated the artistic work process from the distinct plans and designs, seeing it in each stage to be identical with the work as a draft. Therefore, he was able to understand and explain the finished work out of its work process. He did not see the artistic process as a mere fabrication technique, but as a method making visible to our general understanding the essence of what is to be represented.

His first marriage with Ella C. Wollheim dissolved in 1937, Badt married Helen "Leni" Arnheim (1906–1973), the sister of Rudolf Arnheim.

Aged 83, Badt committed suicide together with his second wife.

== Influence ==
Badt was one of the most influential art historians of his time. His work influenced the German art historians such as Gertrude Berthold, Lorenz Dittmann, Martin Gosebruch, Werner Gross, Josef Adolf Schmoll genannt Eisenwerth and Max Imdahl. He is frequently quoted by English and American art historians. For instance, Geoffrey Grigson said, "Painting is a difficult subject to write about, and searching books on particular painters are as rare as unicorns... One of them, and how welcome, is Dr Kurt Badt's The Art of Cézanne.

According to Robert Hobbs, "Badt's study is particularly helpful in articulating certain aspects of [Malcolm] Morley's overall program that has definite affinities with Cézanne's." Mary Jacobus calls Badt a "pioneering writer on Constable's clouds". The Times Literary Supplement called Constable's Clouds the best book on Constable since Leslie's Life. Rudolf Arnheim often cites Badt in his widely read Art and Visual Perception. He writes: "It may seem paradoxical for Kurt Badt to say that Rubens is one of the simplest of all artists.

He explains, 'It is true that in order to grasp his simplicity, one must be able to understand an order that dominates an enormous world of active forces.' Badt defines artistic simplicity as 'the wisest ordering of means based on insight into the essentials, to which everything else must be subservient.' " When Arnheim asked Badt what he meant by "intelligent" art, he answered with the following list: "Artistic intelligence: Michelangelo, Poussin, Delacroix. Lack of it: Memling, Riemenschneider, Ingres, Kandinsky."

"Obituaries in German newspapers described him as one of the most distinguished art historians of Germany."

== Select writings ==
- Andrea Solario: Sein Leben und sein Werke: Ein Beitrag zur Kunstgeschichte der Lombardei. Ph.D. dissertation. University of Freiburg, 1914.
- "Cézanne's Watercolour Technique." The Burlington Magazine, vol. 83, October 1943, pp. 246–248.
- Eugène Delacroix Drawings. Oxford: B. Cassirer, 1946.
- John Constable's Clouds. London: Routledge & K. Paul, 1950.
- The Art of Cézanne. Berkeley: University of California Press, 1965.
- "Raphael's Incendio del Borgo." Journal of the Warburg and Courtauld Institutes, vol. 22, 1959, pp. 35–59.
- Modell und Maler von Jan Vermeer: Probleme der Interpretation. Eine Streitschrift gegen Hans Sedlmayr. Cologne: M. DuMont Schauberg, 1961.
- Die Farbenlehre Van Goghs. Cologne: DuMont, 1961.
- Raumphantasien und Raumillusionen. Das Wesen der Plastik, Cologne: DuMont, 1963.
- Eugène Delacroix: Werke und Ideale. Cologne: DuMont, 1965.
- Kunsttheoretische Versuche: Ausgewählte Aufsätze. Cologne: M. Dumont Schauberg, 1968.
- Die Kunst des Nicolas Poussin. Cologne: DuMont Schauberg, 1969.
- "Ein angebliches Selbstbildnis von Nicolas Poussin." Pantheon, vol. 27, 1969, pp. 395–398.
- Das Spätwerk Cézannes. Constance: Druckerei und Verlagsanstalt Universitätsverlag, 1971.
- Ernst Barlach, der Bildhauer. Neumünster: Wachholtz, 1971.
- Eine Wissenschaftslehre der Kunstgeschichte. Cologne: M. Dumont Schauberg, 1971.
