= Wilhelm Vöge =

German art historian (1868-1952)

- Born: 16 February 1868; Bremen
- Died: 30 December 1952 (aged 84); Ballenstedt, East Germany
- Occupation: Art historian
- Writing career
- Language: German
- Genre: Non-fiction
- Subject: Art

Wilhelm Vöge (16 February 1868 – 30 December 1952) was a German art historian, the discoverer of the Reichenau School of painting and one of the most important medievalists of the early 20th century. Whitney Stoddard called him the "father of modern stylistic analysis" for medieval art.

== Life and work ==
Vöge was born in Bremen. He studied art history under Anton Springer and Paul Clemen at the University of Leipzig, under Carl Justi, Karl Lamprecht and Henry Thode at the University of Bonn, where Aby Warburg and Hermann Ullmann were his classmates, and finally under Hubert Janitschek at the University of Strasbourg. In 1891 he wrote his groundbreaking Ph.D. dissertation on Ottonian painting, based on the Munich manuscript Cim. 58 ("the Evangelary of Otto III"), which established the group of painters known today as the Reichenau School (then however located in Trier). He became a friend of Heinrich Wölfflin. After a research trip in France, where he met the German medievalist Adolph Goldschmidt and the French scholars Gaston Maspero, Eugène Müntz, Camille Enlart, Paul Vitry, Albert Marignan and Louis Courajod, Vöge published a book on French medieval sculpture (Die Anfänge des monumentalen Stiles im Mittelalter, 1894). Then he went to Italy in order to write his Habilitationsschrift on Raphael and Donatello (1895).

In 1896 he taught art history at the University at Strassburg. From 1897 to 1910 he worked at the Berlin Museum under Wilhelm von Bode. Specialized in Christian sculpture he published a study on the Museum's ivory sculpture (Die Elfenbeinbildwerke der königlichen Museen zu Berlin, 1900) and a large catalog entitled Beschreibung der Bildwerke der christlichen Epochen (published in 1910). In 1908 Vöge was recommended by Wölfflin for a chair at the University of Freiburg. There he founded the Institute of Art History, developing a library and a comprehensive photo collection. Among his students in Freiburg were Erwin Panofsky, who wrote his Ph.D. dissertation under Vöge in 1914, Friedrich Winkler, Kurt Badt, Walter Lehmann, Martin Heidegger and Hans Rupe

In his book, Die Anfänge des monumentalen Stiles im Mittelalter (1894) Vöge identified and named the "Headmaster" of the west facade of Chartres Cathedral, while in a later study he dubbed the Joseph and Visitation masters of Reims Cathedral. Though Vöge's approach attempted to impose a nineteenth-century conception of the individual artist on the very different social situation that pertained in the Middle Ages, it became a dominant paradigm for the study of all kinds of medieval art, especially Gothic sculpture.

During World War I Vöge suffered severe insomnia diagnosed as a nervous breakdown in 1916. He resigned from his teaching position, succeeded by Hans Jantzen, and withdrew to Ballenstedt. He began publishing again in the 1930s, but the rise of the Nazis caused a mental and physical retreat. After World War II, he published a monograph on Jörg Syrlin (1950). He died in Ballenstedt, Germany.

His research papers are housed at the Wilhelm-Vöge-Archiv in Freiburg.

== Select publications ==
- Eine deutsche Malerschule um die Wende des ersten Jahrtausends. Ph.D dissertation, Bonn, 1891.
- "Kritische Studien zur Geschichte der Malerei in Deutschland im 10. und 11. Jahrhundert." Westdeutsche Zeitschrift für Geschichte und Kunst, vol. 7, 1891-1894.
- Die Anfänge des monumentalen Stiles im Mittelalter: Eine Untersuchung über die erste Blütezeit französischer Plastik. Strasbourg: Heitz, 1894.
- Raffael und Donatello: Ein Beitrag zur Entwicklungsgeschichte der italienischen Kunst. Strasbourg: Heitz, 1896.
- Die Elfenbeinbildwerke der königlichen Museen zu Berlin. Berlin: Spermann & Reimer, 1900.
- Die deutschen Bildwerke und die der anderen cisalpinen Länder. 2nd ed. Berlin: Reimer, 1910.
- "Die Bahnbrecher des Naturstudiums um 1200". Zeitschrift für bildende Kunst, vol. 25, 1914, pp. 193–216.
- Nicolas Hagnower, der Meister des Isenheimer Hochalters und seine Frühwerke. Freiberg im Breisgau: Urban, 1931.
- Jörg Syrlin der Ältere und sein Bildwerke. Berlin: Deutscher Verein für Kunstwissenschaft, 1950.
- Bildhauer des Mittelalters: Gesammelte Studien von Wilhelm Vöge. Berlin: Gebrüder Mann, 1959.
