= St. Catherine's Church, Lübeck =

Church building in Lübeck's Old City, Germany

Coordinates: 53°52′09″N 10°41′22″E

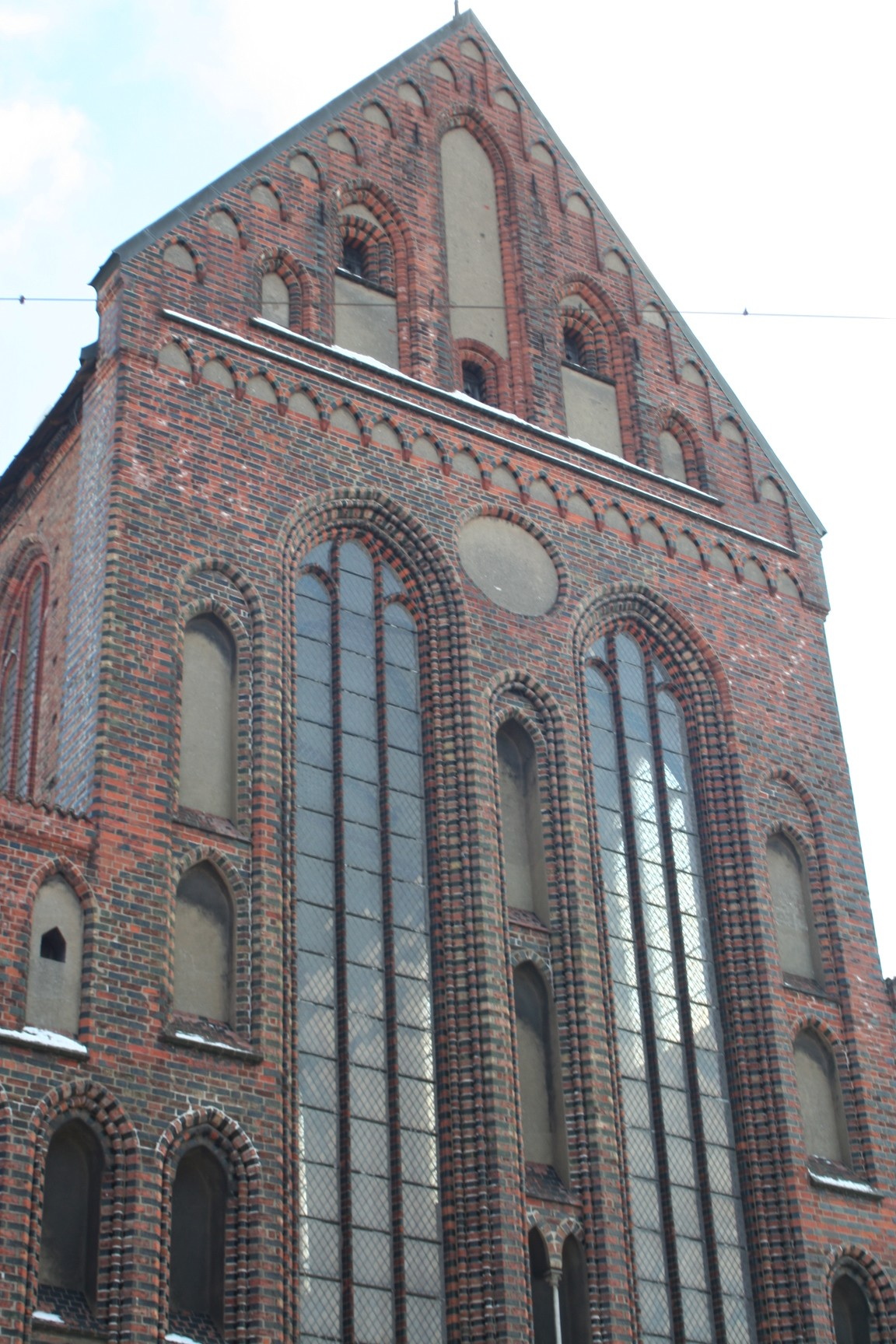
St. Catherine from the west

St. Catherine Church (German: Katharinenkirche) in Lübeck is a Brick Gothic church which belonged to a Franciscan monastery in the name of Saint Catherine of Alexandria, seized along other property from the Catholic Church by a city ordinance (Der keyserliken Lübeck christlike Order Inge. 1531) drawn up by the Lutheran pastor and friend of Martin Luther, Johannes Bugenhagen (who had arrived with his family from Wittenberg on October 28, 1530, at the request of those townsmen in favor of the Reformation to support their cause), passed and implemented on May 27, 1531, as Bugenhagen had previously accomplished this in Braunschweig (on September 5, 1528, with what is considered the first Protestant church ordinance, the Braunschweiger Kirchenordnung and Hamburg (Der ehrbaren Stadt Hamburg Christliche Ordnung. 1529), Lübeck (Der keyserliken Stadt Lübeck christlike Ordeninge. 1531).

The Church was built in the early 14th century. It is part of the Lübeck World Heritage Site and has been used as a museum church and exhibition hall by the Lübeck museums since 1980.

The exhibits include a copy of Saint George and the Dragon made by Bernt Notke for Storkyrkan in Stockholms Gamla Stan, an Epitaph by Godfrey Kneller in memory of his father and another one by Tintoretto, the Resurrection of Lazarus.

Some of the former altars, like Hermen Rode's St. Luke altar, are on permanent exhibit in the St. Annen Museum in Lübeck.

The facade is decorated with 20th-century clinker brick sculptures by Ernst Barlach and Gerhard Marcks.

== Burials ==
- Johann Adam Reincken
