= Albert Renger-Patzsch =

German photographer

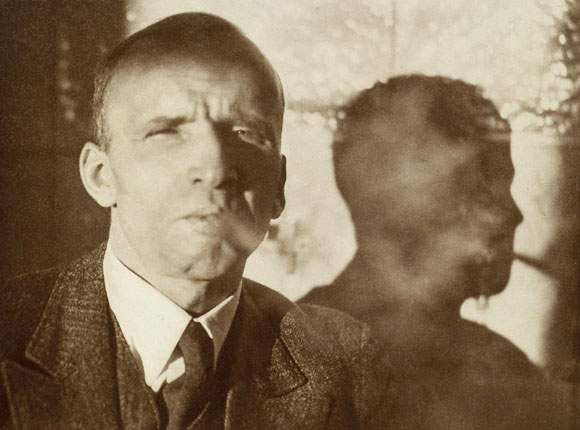
Albert Renger-Patzsch photographed by Hugo Erfurth, 1938

Foxglove (Fingerhut) by Albert Renger-Patzsch, 1922

Albert Renger-Patzsch (June 22, 1897 – September 27, 1966) was a German photographer associated with the New Objectivity.

== Biography ==
Renger-Patzsch was born in Würzburg and began making photographs by age twelve. After military service in the First World War he studied chemistry at the Königlich-Sächsisches Polytechnikum in Dresden. In the early 1920s he worked as a press photographer for the Chicago Tribune before becoming a freelancer and, in 1925, publishing a book, Das Chorgestühl von Kappenberg (The Choir Stalls of Cappenberg). He had his first museum exhibition in Lübeck in 1927.

A second book followed in 1928, Die Welt ist schön (The World is Beautiful). This, his best-known book, is a collection of one hundred of his photographs in which natural forms, industrial subjects and mass-produced objects are presented with the clarity of scientific illustrations. The book's title was chosen by his publisher; Renger-Patzsch's preferred title for the collection was Die Dinge ("The Things").

In its sharply focused and matter-of-fact style, his work exemplifies the esthetic of the New Objectivity that flourished in the arts in Germany during the Weimar Republic. Like Edward Weston and Berenice Abbott in the United States, Renger-Patzsch believed that the value of photography was in its ability to reproduce the texture of reality, and to represent the essence of an object. He wrote: "The secret of a good photograph—which, like a work of art, can have esthetic qualities—is its realism ... Let us therefore leave art to artists and endeavor to create, with the means peculiar to photography and without borrowing from art, photographs which will last because of their photographic qualities."

Among his works of the 1920s are Echeoeria (1922) and Viper's Head (ca. 1925). During the 1930s Renger-Patzsch made photographs for industry and advertising. His archives were destroyed during the Second World War. In 1944 he moved to Wamel, Möhnesee, where he lived the rest of his life.
