= Panofsky (disambiguation) =

Erwin Panofsky (1892–1968) was a German art historian who worked in the U.S.

Panofsky may also refer to:

- Panofsky Prize, awarded in the field of particle physics

== People with the surname ==
- Aaron Panofsky, American sociologist
- Dora Panofsky (1885-1965), German-American art historian
- Wolfgang K. H. Panofsky, German-American physicist

== See also ==
- Panovsky, a rural locality in Vladimir Oblast, Russia
