= James H. Stubblebine =

- Born: 1920
- Died: February 5, 1987 (aged 66–67); New York City, US
- Education: Rutgers University; New York University's Institute of Fine Arts
- Occupation: Art historian
- Notable work: Guido da Siena (1964); Duccio di Buoninsegna and His School, 2 vols. (1979); Assisi and the rise of vernacular art (1985)

James Henry Stubblebine (1920 – February 5, 1987) was an American art historian best known for his scholarship on early Italian painting, particularly the Sienese school of the late thirteenth and early fourteenth centuries. He was a significant figure in the development of medieval and early Renaissance art history as an academic discipline in the United States during the mid- to late twentieth century.

He specialized in Italian medieval and early Renaissance painting (ca. 13th–14th centuries), with a particular focus on Sienese artists such as Duccio di Buoninsegna. As the National Gallery of Art notes, he was "primarily interested in 13th- and 14th-century painting, particularly Duccio di Buoninsegna and his school." Stubblebine was part of the scholarly lineage of Richard Offner (a student of Erwin Panofsky); Offner advised Stubblebine's graduate work. His dissertation on early Trecento painting was later published as Guido da Siena (Princeton, 1964). Stubblebine served on the Rutgers faculty from 1957 onward, eventually becoming a full professor. He chaired Rutgers' Art Department in the 1960s and helped establish its graduate program. In 1969–70 he was a Samuel H. Kress Fellow at Harvard's Villa I Tatti in Florence, working on a project titled "Corpus of Ducciesque Paintings". In the late 1970s he also taught as a professor of art history at New York University's Institute of Fine Arts.

== Academic career ==
Stubblebine earned his doctorate under Richard Offner. He joined Rutgers University in 1957, where he taught until the late 1970s. At Rutgers he rose to full professor and served as chair of the Art Department (circa 1961–1969), expanding its curriculum and helping found the graduate Art History program. He also held visiting appointments; for example, he was a visiting lecturer at the University of Pennsylvania in 1965–66. His Kress Fellowship at Villa I Tatti (1969–70) supported his in-depth study of Sienese art. Later (1977–86) he was on the faculty of the NYU Institute of Fine Arts. By the time of his death in 1987, Stubblebine was widely recognized as a leading scholar of Italian Duecento and Trecento painting.

== Major works ==
His major monographs and edited volumes include the following:

Guido da Siena (Princeton, 1964). This was a revision of his doctoral dissertation—a monograph on the 13th-century Sienese painter Guido da Siena. It examines Guido's works and their attributions; as noted in a rare books listing, the study “includes new information on Duccio and some of his contemporaries.

Giotto: The Arena Chapel Frescoes (editor, Norton Critical Studies in Art History, 1969). In this Norton Critical Edition volume (first published in 1969), Stubblebine collected background materials, critical essays, and commentary on Giotto's frescoes in Padua's Scrovegni Chapel. It includes 129 illustrations and an introductory essay by Stubblebine.

Duccio di Buoninsegna and His School (2 vols., Princeton, 1979). This two-volume study provides a catalogue and analysis of Duccio's works and those of his followers. One reviewer notes that the second volume contains over 500 black-and-white photographs of paintings, including every surviving Duccio and many by his workshop.

Dugento Painting: An Annotated Bibliography (G. K. Hall, 1983). In this ereference work, Stubblebine compiled an annotated bibliography of writings on 13th-century (Duecento) Italian painting. The title Dugento Painting refers to the 1200s.

Assisi and the Rise of Vernacular Art (Harper & Row, 1985). In this later book, part of the Icon Editions series, Stubblebine explored the St. Francis fresco cycle in the Upper Basilica of San Francesco in Assisi. He argued for the importance of Italian vernacular (as opposed to purely classical or Byzantine) sources and modes of expression in these late-13th-century murals.

He also published many scholarly articles. For example, in 1966 he contributed "Byzantine Influence in Thirteenth-Century Italian Panel Painting" to Dumbarton Oaks Papers, examining how Byzantine stylistic elements appeared in Italian Trecento works. In symposia and journals he addressed topics such as the iconography of St. Francis, the attribution of individual panels, and other aspects of medieval Italian art.

== Areas of specialization ==
Stubblebine's scholarship centered on Italian medieval painting and its transition toward the Renaissance. He was a noted specialist on artists such as Coppo di Marcovaldo and Guido da Siena (13th-century Sienese masters, whom he and his colleague Gertrude Coor each treated in early work). He became especially known for his Duccio research—both through his Duccio volumes and through a large photographic archive. According to the National Gallery of Art, Stubblebine's archive (now at NYU/Met) documents Duccio di Buoninsegna and his school and includes extensive notes on Duccio. Stubblebine's work on the Assisi frescoes emphasized how local Italian narrative traditions were woven into the iconography of St. Francis, influencing later Renaissance art. While some later scholars debated or revised his dating of the Assisi frescoes, his emphasis on vernacular elements in that program (as outlined in Assisi and the Rise of Vernacular Art) was influential in the field.

In general, Stubblebine contributed to art history by documenting and re-evaluating the early Italian Duecento and Trecento. He often argued for revised attributions or dates based on careful stylistic analysis. For example, his monographs provided fresh assessments of many works formerly attributed to other hands. His annotated bibliography (Dugento Painting) became a valuable reference for scholars. As a teacher and mentor at Rutgers and elsewhere, he trained a generation of students in medieval Italian art.

== Research approach ==
Stubblebine's scholarly method combined visual analysis with extensive documentation. He exemplified the mid-20th-century "connoisseurship" tradition: he examined paintings image by image, noting stylistic details, iconographic motifs, and any archival evidence. His publications are known for their thoroughness; the Duccio study, for instance, is lavishly illustrated (the two volumes contain over 600 images) to support his arguments. He also emphasized compiling data and sources. His Dugento Painting bibliography (1983) reflects a methodical approach to gathering all known literature on 13th-century Italian art. He helped lay the groundwork for later studies of early Renaissance imagery, blending visual analysis with cultural interpretation.

== Sources ==
Authoritative references on Stubblebine include the Rutgers Art Review memorial issue dedicated to him (1987) and entries in art-history reference works. Details above are drawn from institutional sources and publications. For example, the National Gallery of Art confirms his Rutgers professorship and period of specialization. Stubblebine's own publications (books and articles) are cited for dates and content. His Villa I Tatti fellowship (1969–70) is documented by the Harvard newsletter. Descriptions of his major books come from library and art-history sources (e.g., the Princeton University Press catalog and contemporary reviews).

== Bibliography (books and papers) ==
- 1957: «An altarpiece by Guido da Siena and his narrative style», en Marsyas, 8 (1957/1959), pp. 83–84.
- 1959: «An altarpiece by Guido da Siena», en The Art Bulletin, 41 (1959), pp. 260–268.
- 1964: Guido da Siena, Princeton, NJ: Princeton University Press.
- 1966: «Byzantine influence in thirteen-century Italian panel painting», en Dumbarton Oaks Papers, 20 (1966), pp. 85–101.
- 1966: «Two Byzantine Madonnas from Calahorra, Spain», en The Art Bulletin, 48 (1966), pp. 379–381.
- 1967: «Cimabue's frescoes of the Virgin at Assisi», en The Art Bulletin, 49 (1967), pp. 330–333.
- 1967: «The Italian heritage», en The Burlington Magazine, 109 (1967), pp. 487–488.
- 1969: Giotto: The Arena Chapel Frescoes; with Source Material and Selected Critical Writings, London: Thames & Hudson.
- 1969: «The Angel Pinnacles on Duccio's ‘Maestà'», en The Art Quarterly, 32 (1969), pp. 131–152.
- 1969: «Segna di Buonaventura and the Image of the Man of Sorrows», en Gesta, 8 (1969), pp. 3–13.
- 1971: «[Review of] Berenson, Bernard: Homeless Paintings of the Renaissance», en Pantheon, 29 (1971), p. 80.
- 1972: «Duccio's Maestà of 1302 for the Chapel of the Nove», en The Art Quarterly, 35 (1972), pp. 239–268.
- 1972: «The Frick Flagellation Reconsidered», en Gesta, 11 (1972), pp. 3–10.
- 1972: «The Role of Segna di Buonaventura in the Shop of Duccio», en Pantheon, 30 (1972), pp. 272–282.
- 1973: «Duccio and his Collaborators on the Cathedral Maestà», en The Art Bulletin, 55 (1973), pp. 185–204.
- 1973: «Cimabue and Duccio in Santa Maria Novella», en Pantheon, 31 (1973), pp. 15–21.
- 1975: «The Development of the Throne in Dugento Tuscan Painting», en Marsyas, 17 (1974/1975), pp. 25–39.
- 1975: «Byzantine Sources for the Iconography of Duccio's Maestà», en The Art Bulletin, 57 (1975), pp. 176–185.
- 1977: «The Back Predella of Duccio's Maestà», en Studies in Late Medieval and Renaissance Painting in Honor of Millard Meiss, Nueva York: New York University Press, pp. 430–436.
- 1978: «The Ducciesque Maestà for Massa Marittima», en History of Art, pp. 357–367.
- 1978: «The Boston Ducciesque Tabernacle: A Collaboration», en Collaboration in Italian Renaissance Art, pp. 1–19.
- 1978: «‘The Face in the Crowd': Some Early Sienese Self-Portraits», en Apollo, 108 (1978), pp. 388–393.
- 1979: Duccio di Buoninsegna and his School. 1, Text, Princeton, NJ: Princeton University Press.
- 1979: Duccio di Buoninsegna and his School. 2, Plates, Princeton, NJ: Princeton University Press.
- 1980: «Early Masaccio: A Hypothetical, Lost Madonna and a Disattribution», en The Art Bulletin, 62 (1980), pp. 217–225.
- 1983: Dugento Painting: An Annotated Bibliography, Boston, MA: Hall.
- 1983: «[Review of] Offner, Richard: A Critical and Historical Corpus of Florentine Painting», en The Art Bulletin, 65 (1983), pp. 506–508.
- 1984: «[Review of] Fleming, John: From Bonaventure to Bellini», en Renaissance Quarterly, 37 (1984), pp. 95–98.
- 1985: «Ugolino di Nerio: Old and New in an Early Madonna», en Apollo, 121 (1985), pp. 366–372.
- 1985: «A New Chronology for the St. Cecilia Master», en Tribute to Lotte Brand Philip, pp. 205–216.
- 1985: Assisi and the Rise of Vernacular Art, Nueva York: Harper & Row.
- 1986: «A Ugolino Problem», en Apollo, 123 (1986), pp. 224–289.
- 1986: «Assisi and the Rise of the Vernacular», en Europäische Kunst um 1300, pp. 143–147.
- 1987: «A Crucifix for Saint Bona», en Apollo, 125 (1987), pp. 160–165.
- 1990: «French Gothic Elements in Simone Martini's Maestà», en Gesta, 29 (1990), pp. 139–152.
