= Irving Lavin =

American art historian (1927–2019)

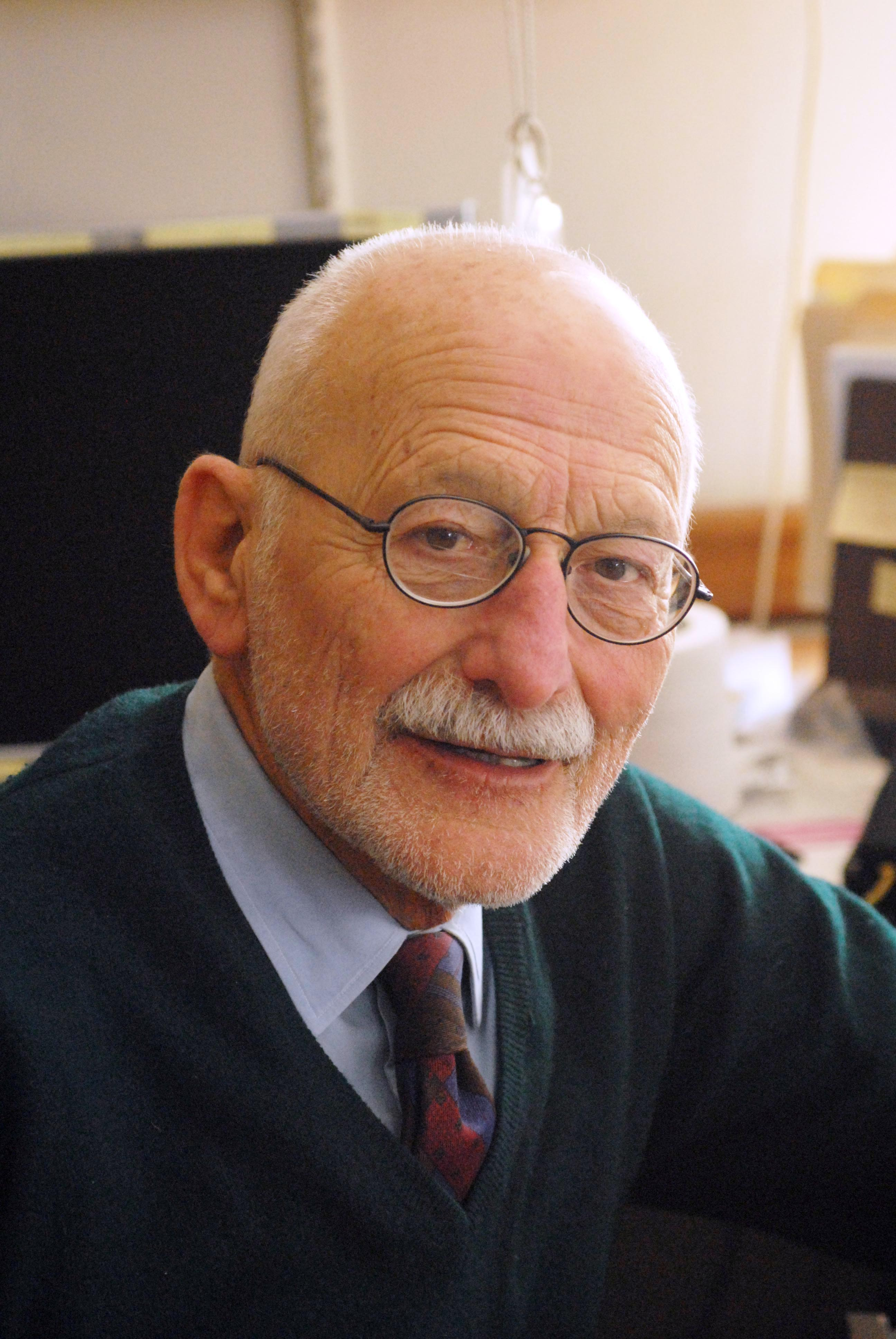
- Irving Lavin in 2006
- Born: 14 December 1927; St. Louis, Missouri, U.S.
- Died: 3 February 2019 (aged 91); Princeton, New Jersey, U.S.
- Occupation: Art Historian
- Years active: 1949–2019

Irving Lavin (14 December 1927 – 3 February 2019) was an art historian of Late Antique, Medieval, Renaissance, Baroque, and Modern painting, sculpture, and architecture. His wide-ranging contributions centered primarily on the correlation between form and meaning in the visual arts.

== Scholarly life and work ==
Irving Lavin was born in St. Louis, Missouri, the son of Isadore Lavin and Jenny Shuff. Lavin began his career studying philosophy, first at the University of Illinois at Urbana-Champaign, then as a student of Horst W. Janson at Washington University in St. Louis, where he graduated with a B.A. in 1949. At the invitation of Bertrand Russell, Lavin went to Cambridge University to become his tutee. The following year, as he often joked, he turned to a more practical field, namely art history. At the Institute of Fine Arts, New York University, he studied with, and was the assistant to, Walter Friedländer, Richard Offner, and Erwin Panofsky. With Horst W. Janson he wrote his master's thesis, "The Sources of Donatello's Bronze Pulpits in Lorenzo" (1951), and received his M.A. in 1952. At Harvard University he received a second M.A. in 1953, working with Ernst Kitzinger and John Coolidge. Under the latter, he wrote his doctoral thesis on "The Bozzetti of Gianlorenzo Bernini," and received his Ph.D. in 1955 from Harvard University. He served in the U.S. Army from 1955 to 1957 as Assistant for the Human Resources Research Office, Continental Army Command at Fort Monroe, Virginia, Specialist Second Class. Between 1957 and 1959, Lavin was a Senior Fellow at the Dumbarton Oaks Research Center in Washington, D.C., where he wrote a major study of "The Hunting Mosaics of Antioch and Their Sources: A Study of Compositional Principles in the Development of Early Mediaeval Style" (1963).

Lavin's success became noteworthy early on: his publications won the College Art Association's prestigious Arthur Kingsley Porter Prize for Scholars under 40 on three occasions (1959, 1962, and 1968), so often, in fact, the paradigm for the prize was changed. After teaching art history at Vassar College for two years (1959–61), Lavin began a period of over twenty years in which he alternated teaching at New York University—first at Washington Square College, then in 1967 at the Institute of Fine Arts graduate school—and doing intensive research in Rome, Italy. His work was supported there by various grants, including a Senior Fulbright Scholarship, Italy, 1961–63; a Senior Fellowship from the American Council of Learned Societies, 1965–66; and a Guggenheim Fellowship, 1968–69. Circa 1966, he made a historic discovery of the previously unknown earliest portrait bust (1612, Antonio Coppola) by the young prodigy Gianlorenzo Bernini, thirteen years old at the time, along with another equally remarkable unknown bust of Antonio Cepparelli dated 1622. These revelations were the first of many such Bernini discoveries made throughout Lavin's career, the last of which is a black and white marble sculpture of the famous Roman lawyer Prospero Farinacci, published in spring 2018.

Lavin was appointed in 1973 as Professor in the School of Historical Studies at the Institute for Advanced Study in Princeton, New Jersey, to the chair previously held by Erwin Panofsky and Millard Meiss. From that position, Lavin contributed to many aspects of art history’s position in America. He broadened the emphasis of scholarship from its long-held tightly Eurocentric attention, to include for the first time in the memberships at the Institute, on the board of the Comité International d'Histoire de l'Art, and in the programs of meetings of the College Art Association, specialists in the fields of African art, the art of Mexico and South America, India, and the Far East. As a founding committee member, he played a major role in the creation of three new research institutes in North America: the Getty Research Institute, Los Angeles; the Center for Advanced Study in the Visual Arts, the National Gallery of Art, Washington, D.C.; and the Canadian Centre for Architecture, Montreal, Canada.

Lavin’s deep knowledge of Italian art and culture was the result of over fifty years of study, particularly in Rome, where he embraced the city, created enduring academic colleagues and friends, and encouraged Italian art history to expand from its traditional emphasis on national and stylistic concerns into a broader world of intellectual creativity. For this gift, the city offered him many honors, including the Tercentennial Medal, commemorating the death of Bernini (1980), the Premio Daria Borghese (1981), and appointed him Honorary Member of the Corporation of Sculptors and Marble Workers of Rome, as well as Membro Straniero della Accademia Nazionale dei Lincei. He also received the Premio Internazionale “Galileo Galilei” from the University of Pisa (2005), the Sescentennial Medal, commemorating the birth of Donatello, from L’Accademia delle Arti del Disegno, Florence (1986) and Accademico d'Onore by Accademia Clementina, Bologna (1986). In 2019, Lavin was posthumously named Grand'Ufficiale dell'Ordine al Merito della Repubblica Italiana.

Lavin’s publications show his wide-ranging intellectual interests: from late antique architecture (Triclinia) to North African, particularly Tunisian, floor mosaics, the Renaissance (Donatell), Michelangelo, Pontormo, and Giovanna Giambologna), the Baroque (Caravaggio and Gian Lorenzo Bernini), to the twentieth century, with essays on Pablo Picasso and Jackson Pollock. He also communicated easily with practicing artists and was close friends with George Segal, Mel Bochner, and Frank Stella, and traveled with and wrote about Frank O. Gehry.

Lavin was a celebrated lecturer: he gave the Franklin Jasper Walls Lecture at the Pierpont Morgan Library in New York (1975); the Slade Lectures at Oxford University in 1985; the Thomas Spencer Jerome Lectures at the University of Michigan and the American Academy in Rome, 1985–86; the Una’s Lectures in the Humanities, University of California, Berkeley, 1987; and the A. W. Mellon Lectures in the Fine Arts, National Gallery of Art, Washington, D.C., 2004.

His books include Bernini and the Crossing of St. Peter’s (1968); Bernini and the Unity of the Visual Arts (1980); Past–Present: Essays on Historicism in Art from Donatello to Picasso (1993); Santa Maria del Fiore: Il Duomo di Firenze e la Vergine Incinta (1999); and Caravaggio e La Tour: La Luce Occulta di Dio (2000). The first two volumes of a projected six-volume edition of his collected works have been published as Visible Spirit: The Art of Gianlorenzo Bernini (2007–09), while the third volume has appeared as Bernini at St. Peter’s: The Pilgrimage (2012). A gathering of his essays on modern and contemporary art, The Art of Art History, has also appeared in Italian as L’Arte della storia dell’arte (2008). His last publication was an article on "The Silence of David by Gianlorenzo Bernini," which will be published posthumously in the periodical Artibus et Historiae in spring 2019.

Lavin retired in 2001 and continued to live and work at the Institute for Advanced Study with his wife of sixty-six years, the art historian Marilyn Aronberg Lavin, who edited his Festschrift, Rome Italy Renaissance: Essays Honoring Irving Lavin on His 60th Birthday. Although there is no teaching at the Institute for Advanced Study, Lavin continued to do so at New York University and Princeton University. Some of his many noteworthy students include now close colleagues Jack Freiberg, David Levine, Nicola Courtright, Gail Feigenbaum, and Charles Scribner III.

== Select publications ==
- Bernini and the Crossing of St. Peter's (1968).
- Bernini and the Unity of the Visual Arts (1980).
- Gianlorenzo Bernini: New Aspects of his Art and Thought: A Commemorative Volume (1986).
- Past-Present: Essays on Historicism in Art from Donatello to Picasso (1993).
- Meaning in the Visual Arts: Views from the Outside: A Centennial Commemoration of Erwin Panofsky (1892–1968) (1995).
- Santa Maria del Fiore: Il Duomo di Firenze e la Vergine Incinta (1999).
- Caravaggio e La Tour: La Luce Occulta di Dio (2000).
- (with Marilyn Aronberg Lavin) Images from the "Song of Songs" in the Art of Cimabue, Michelangelo, and Rembrandt (2002).
- Visible Spirit: The Art of Gianlorenzo Bernini (2007–09).
- L'Arte della storia dell'arte (2008).
- "The Silence of Bernini's David" (2018).

== Bibliography ==
All of Lavin's writings, including books (except the two larger books), articles, and Occasional Papers are freely available as downloads online in PDF form at http://publications.ias.edu/il.
