= Early Netherlandish Painting (Panofsky book) =

Book by Erwin Panofsky

- First edition, Volume one: Text, Volume two: Plates
- Author: Erwin Panofsky
- Cover artist: Volume one: Madonna of Chancellor Rolin, c. 1435 by Jan van Eyck; Volume two: The Virgin of the Annunciation, from the Portinari Triptych, c. 1479 by Hugo van der Goes
- Language: English
- Genre: Art history
- Publisher: Harvard University Press
- Publication date: 1953
- Publication place: United States
- Media type: Print (hardback (1953) and paperback (1971))
- Pages: Vol I: 358 pages of text, 150 pages of notes; Vol II: 496 illustrations
- ISBN: 978-0-06-436683-0

Early Netherlandish Painting: Its Origins and Character is a 1953 book on art history by Erwin Panofsky, derived from the 1947–48 Charles Eliot Norton Lectures. The book had a wide impact on studies of Renaissance art and Early Netherlandish painting in particular, but also studies in iconography, art history, and intellectual history in general. The book is particularly well-known for its iconographic treatment of Van Eyck's Arnolfini Portrait as a kind of marriage contract, a hypothesis advanced by Panofsky as early as 1934. The book remains influential despite its reliance on black-and-white reproductions of paintings, which led to some errors of analysis.

Early Netherlandish Painting shares its title with the comprehensive, 14-volume survey by Max J. Friedländer, a fact obliquely acknowledged at the beginning of the preface. Panofsky, however, completes his book prior to including any discussion of interpretation of Bosch and Bruegel.

== Synopsis ==
The book starts with an analysis of Franco-Flemish book illumination as setting a significant artistic standard for future generations in Early Netherlandish Painting after the 13th century. These early developments set a path for the later emergence of Jan van Eyck and his brother which would eventually lead to the accomplishments of Rogier van der Weyden in the penultimate chapter. The book concludes before any further evaluation of Netherlandish art as would be found eventually in Hieronymus Bosch and Pieter Bruegel the Elder. The final chapter of 55 pages is titled as the Epilogue and contains commentary on nearly a half dozen painters following Rogier van der Weyden which includes Dieric Bouts and Geertgen tot Sint Jans. The closing chapter ends with a two page explanation of Panofsky's reasons for not taking up the artist he prefers to transliterate as 'Jerome' Bosch stating that the literature about Bosch is still lacking in the type of insight needed for him analyze Bosch from a perspective comparable to his analysis of artists such as Van Eyck and van der Weyden. The printing of the book is usually presented as a 2-volume edition with the first volume containing all of the prose for the separate chapters, and the second volume containing all of the reproductions of the art works as designated by the figure numbers used in volume one.

== Sources ==
- Holly, Michael Ann. Panofsky and the Foundations of Art History. Ithaca, N.Y.: Cornell University Press, 1984
- Nash, Susie. "Erwin Panofsky, Early Netherlandish Painting: Its Origins and Character, 1953". In: The Books that Shaped Art History, London: Thames & Hudson, 2013
- Panofsky, Erwin. Early Netherlandish Painting, Its Origins and Character. Cambridge (MA): Harvard University Press, 1953
- Podro, Michael. The Critical Historians of Art. New Haven (CT): Yale University Press, 1982
