= Warburg Haus, Hamburg =

German art history and iconography forum

Coordinates: 53°35′16″N 9°59′46″E

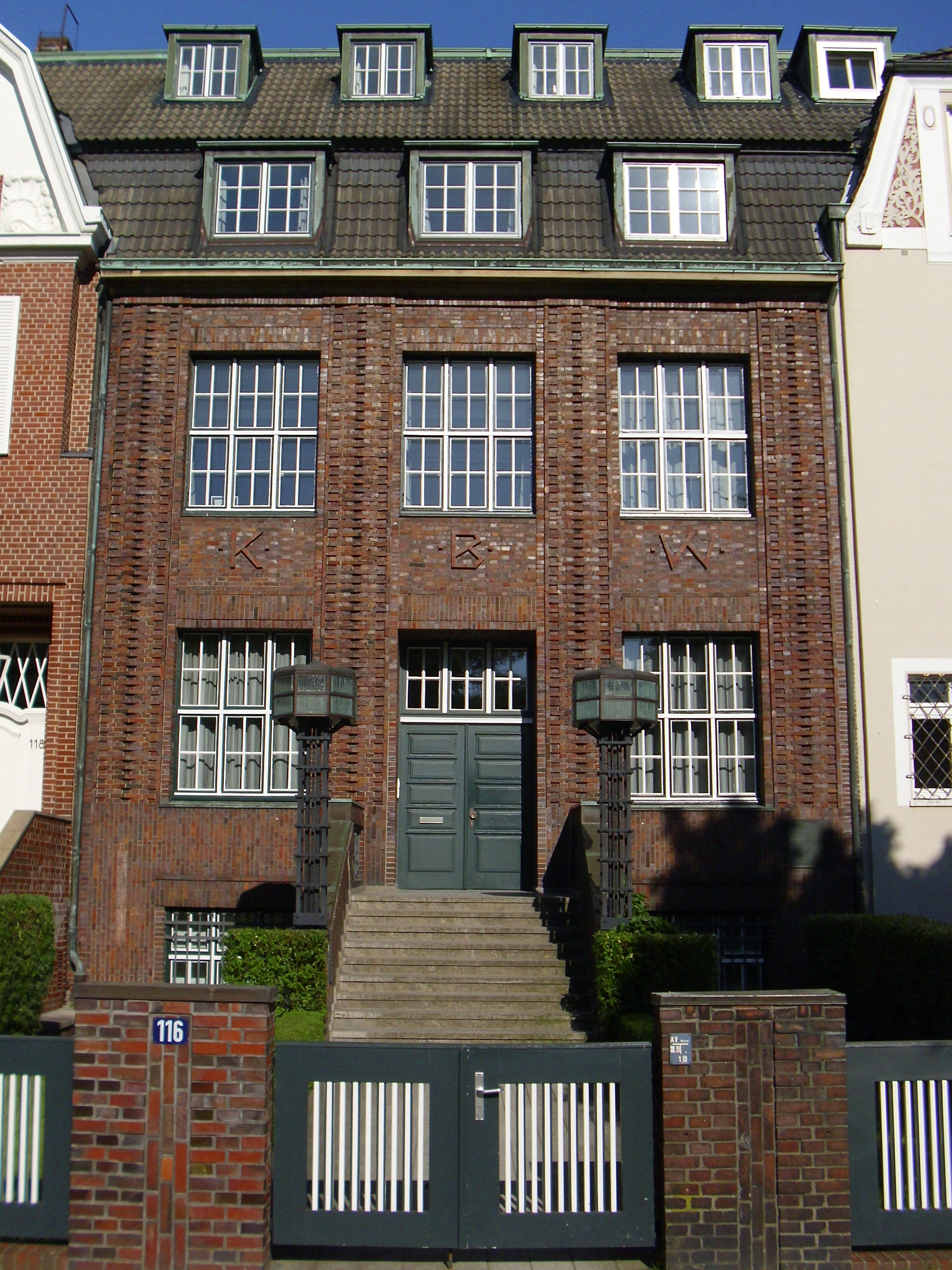
Warburg Haus at Heilwigstraße 116

The Warburg Haus, Hamburg is a German interdisciplinary forum for art history and cultural sciences and primarily for political iconography. It is dedicated to the life and work of Aby Warburg and run by the University of Hamburg as a semi-independent seminar. "It issues a series of art historical publications directly modeled on the original institution's studies and lectures, and is a sponsor of the reprinted 'Study Edition' released through the Akademie Verlag in Berlin."

Built in 1926 for the Kulturwissenschaftliche Bibliothek Warburg (KBW) in Heilwigstraße 116, Eppendorf, Hamburg, the Warburg Haus was a center of interdisciplinary research and global exchange in the humanities during the Weimar Republic.

The Warburg Haus helped to shape the thought and work of some of the greatest scholars of the first half of the twentieth century, from Fritz Saxl and Erwin Panofsky to Ernst Cassirer. In 1933, the house was closed and its library shipped to London in order to escape the clutches of the Nazis. The original library is now part of the Warburg Institute in London.

In 1993, the house was acquired by the city of Hamburg and renovated. Since 1995, the building of the "cultural studies library" is used for artistic and cultural research, and art historical seminars, workshops, and colloquiums. In 2001, the archive of the Hamburg-born art historian, William S. Heckscher (1904-1999), was shipped from Princeton to the Warburg Haus.

For many years, the German art historian Martin Warnke directed the Center for Political Iconography at the Warburg Haus.

== See also ==
- Warburg Institute
- Hamburg School of Art History
