= Early Netherlandish Painting (Friedländer) =

Books by Max Jakob Friedländer, 1924 to 1937

Early Netherlandish Painting (German: Die altniederländische Malerei) is a pioneering 14-volume series of illustrated books by the German art historian Max Jakob Friedländer (1867–1958). The first volume was published in 1924, and the series ran until 1937. It was the first comprehensive modern art-historical survey of Early Netherlandish painting, a term often used in art history to describe artists of the Low Countries during the 15th- and 16th-century Northern Renaissance.

Friedländer developed an interest in northern art of the period while director of the Kaiser-Friedrich-Museum in the late 1920s and early 1930s. The collection included a large selection of Flemish paintings, including Jan van Eyck's Madonna in the Church, Rogier van der Weyden's Miraflores Altarpiece and Saint John Altarpiece, and Hugo van der Goes's Adoration of the Magi. Friedländer was struck by the lack of biographical detail on even the most accomplished of the artists, some of whom were still identified by notnames, the sometimes poorly supported attributions, and general historical neglect.

The book focuses on establishing biographical details for the painters, attributing individual works, and detailing their major stylistic themes and techniques. The undertaking was extremely difficult, given the scant historical record of even the most significant artists.

The series was a major influence on Erwin Panofsky's equally seminal Early Netherlandish Painting, which expanded on Friedländer's biographical and stylistic analysis to focus on iconography and historical context.

== Sources ==
- McNamee, Maurice. Vested Angels: Eucharistic Allusions in Early Netherlandish Paintings. Peeters Publishers, 1998. ISBN 978-9042900073
- Silver, Larry. "The State of Research in Northern European Art of the Renaissance Era". The Art Bulletin, Volume 68, No. 4, 1986
