= Werner Hofmann (art historian) =

Austrian art historian (1928–2013)

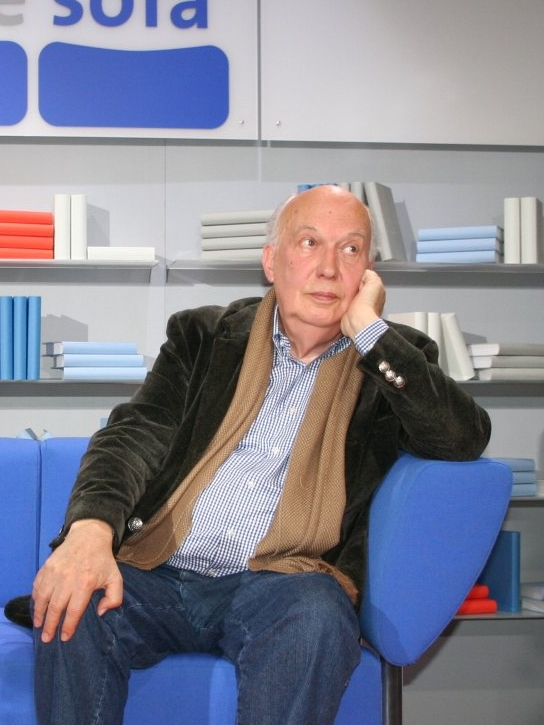
Werner Hofmann (2010)

Werner Hofmann (8 August 1928 in Vienna – 13 March 2013 in Hamburg) was an Austrian art historian, cultural journalist, writer, curator and museum director, who is "considered by his colleagues as one of the most distinguished European scholars of modern art and its ideology."

== Life and work ==
Hofmann was the son of Leopold Hofmann and Anna Visvader. From 1947 to 1949, he studied art history at the universities of Vienna and Paris, where he completed a Ph.D. dissertation on the "Graphische Gestaltungsweise von Honoré Daumier". From 1950 to 1955 he worked as an assistant at the Albertina in Vienna. At that time, he was also a visiting professor at Barnard College, Columbia University in New York. In 1960, he published his groundbreaking study on 19th-century European art, Das Irdische Paradies: Kunst im 19. Jahrhundert, which was soon translated into English. In it, he explained 19th-century art out of its opposing themes rather than in a chronological manner. In 1964 he was a visiting professor at the University of California at Berkeley.

In 1962, Hofmann was the founding director of Vienna's Museum of the 20th Century, which he ran until 1969 – today mumok (Museum Moderner Kunst Stiftung Ludwig Wien). From 1969 to 1990 he was director of the Hamburger Kunsthalle. From 1981 to 1982, he held a visiting professorship at Harvard University in Cambridge, Massachusetts.

Hofmann curated famous "Kunst um 1800" exhibitions at the Hamburger Kunsthalle on Caspar David Friedrich, Philipp Otto Runge, William Blake, Henry Fuseli, John Flaxman, J. M. W. Turner and Francisco de Goya and also exhibitions on contemporary artists such as Franz Erhard Walther, Joseph Beuys and Georg Baselitz, which are "regarded as milestones in the history of exhibitions at the Hamburger Kunsthalle and for German art museums."

Hofmann is known for having connected two schools of art history: the Vienna School with the Hamburg School. According to the Dictionary of Art Historians, his "work was highly interdisciplinary, drawing examples from music, philosophy and literature to elucidate what were in many cases well-known works of art in new ways. This non-linear, a-historical (but not anti-historical) view of art history influenced a generation of modernist art historians who viewed their art works thematically rather than as a series of style changes."

Still full of energy and having a new project on "Kunstkammern" and Julius von Schlosser's work on the same subject in mind, Hofmann died of a heart attack in a hospital.

== Awards ==
- 1990: Commandeur de l'Ordre des Arts et des Lettres
- 1991: Sigmund-Freud-Preis für wissenschaftliche Prosa
- 1992: Preis der Stadt Wien für Geisteswissenschaften
- 2008: Aby Warburg Prize

== Select publications ==
- Die Karikatur von Leonardo bis Picasso. Hamburg 1956.
  - Translated into English as Caricature from Leonardo to Picasso. London 1957.
- Zeichen und Gestalt: Die Malerei des 20. Jahrhunderts. Frankfurt am Main 1957.
- Die Plastik des 20. Jahrhunderts. Frankfurt am Main 1958.
- Henry Moore: Schriften und Skulpturen. Frankfurt am Main 1959.
- Das irdische Paradies: Kunst im 19. Jahrhundert. Munich 1960.
  - Translated into English as Art in the Nineteenth Century, London 1961, and as The Earthly Paradise: Art in the Nineteenth Century, New York 1961.
- L'ouuvre graphique de Georges Braque. Lausanne 1959.
  - German edition: Georges Braque: Das graphische Werk. Stuttgart 1961.
- Grundlagen der modernen Kunst: Eine Einführung in ihre symbolischen Formen Stuttgart 1966. Fourth edition, 2003.
- Von der Nachahmung zur Wirklichkeit: Die schöpferische Befreiung der Kunst 1890–1917. Cologne 1974.
  - English edition: Turning Points in 20th Century Art. London 1969.
- Kunst und Politik: Über die gesellschaftliche Konsequenz des schöpferischen Handelns. Cologne 1969.
- Gustav Klimt und die Wiener Jahrhundertwende. Salzburg 1970. New edition, Hamburg 2008.
  - English edition: Gustav Klimt. Greenwich, CT 1972.
- Nana: Mythos und Wirklichkeit. Cologne 1973.
- Marsyas und Apoll. Munich 1973.
- Ossian und die Kunst um 1800. Exhibition catalog, Hamburger Kunsthalle 1974.
- Das irdische Paradies: Motive und Ideen des 19. Jahrhunderts. Munich 1974.
- Caspar David Friedrich: Kunst um 1800. Exhibition catalog, Hamburger Kunsthalle, 14 September – 3 November 1974.
- (with Gert Schiff), Johann Heinrich Füssli, 1741–1825. Munich 1974.
- Henry Fuseli, 1741–1825. Exhibition catalog, Hamburger Kunsthalle and Tate Gallery, London 1975.
- William Blake, 1757–1827. Exhibition catalog, Hamburger Kunsthalle 1975.
- William Turner und die Landschaft seiner Zeit. Exhibition catalog, Hamburger Kunsthalle 1976.
- Runge in seiner Zeit. Exhibition catalog, Hamburger Kunsthalle 1977.
- John Flaxman: Mythologie und Industrie. Exhibition catalog, Hamburger Kunsthalle 1979.
- Bruchlinien: Aufsätze zur Kunst des 19. Jahrhunderts. Munich 1979.
- Gegenstimmen. Aufsätze zur Kunst des 20. Jahrhunderts. Frankfurt am Main 1979.
- Daumier et ses amis républicains. Exhibition catalog, Musée Cantini, Marseille 1979.
- Goya: Das Zeitalter der Revolutionen, 1789–1830. Exhibition catalog, Hamburger Kunsthalle 1980.
- Menzel, der Beobachter. Exhibition catalog, Hamburger Kunsthalle 1982.
- Luther und die Folgen für die Kunst. Exhibition catalog. Hamburger Kunsthalle 1983.
- Pariser Leben: Toulouse-Lautrec und seine Welt. Exhibition catalog. Hamburger Kunsthalle, 1985–1986.
- Eva und die Zukunft: Das Bild der Frau seit der Französischen Revolution. Exhibition catalog. Hamburger Kunsthalle 1986.
- (with Christoph Stöltzl), Künstler sehen Frieden und Krieg. Exhibition catalog. Hamburger Kunsthalle 1987.
- Anhaltspunkte: Studien zur Kunst und Kunsttheorie. Frankfurt am Main 1989.
- Europa 1789: Aufklärung, Verklärung, Verfall. Exhibition catalog, Hamburger Kunsthalle 1989.
- Das entzweite Jahrhundert, 1750–1830. Munich 1995.
- Wie Deutsch ist die deutsche Kunst? Eine Streitschrift. Leipzig 1999.
- Caspar David Friedrich: Naturwirklichkeit und Kunstwahrheit. Munich 2000.
- Goya: Vom Himmel durch die Welt zur Hölle. Munich 2003.
  - English edition: Goya: To Every Story there Belongs Another. London and New York 2003.
- Daumier und Deutschland. Berlin 2004.
- Die gespaltene Moderne: Aufsätze zur Kunst. Munich 2004.
- Degas und sein Jahrhundert. Munich 2007.
- Phantasiestücke: Über das Phantastische in der Kunst. Munich 2010.
- Die Schönheit ist eine Linie: 13 Variationen über ein Thema. Munich 2014.
