= Dora Panofsky =

German-American art historian

- Born: Dorothea Mosse; 24 July 1885; Berlin, Prussia
- Died: 16 October 1965 (aged 80)
- Citizenship: Germany; United States
- Spouse: Erwin Panofsky (m. 1916)
- Children: Hans Panofsky; Wolfgang K. H. Panofsky
- Scientific career
- Fields: Art history

Dora Panofsky (née Dorothea Mosse; 24 July 1885 – 16 October 1965) was a German-American art historian.

== Life ==
Dorothea Mosse was born in 1885, the daughter of jurist Albert Mosse of Berlin. In 1915 she met the art historian Erwin Panofsky, eight years her junior, in the Berlin seminar of medievalist Adolph Goldschmidt. The couple married in 1916. They had two sons, Hans (1917-1988) and Wolfgang (1919-2007). In 1934 the family escaped Germany, and in 1940 Dora and Erwin became naturalized US citizens.

In 1936 Dora worked with William Heckscher on an index of pathos formulae, though it was "only between 1943 and 1958 that she was able to undertake her own research and publish scientific papers".

Erwin Panofsky was nicknamed 'Pan' and 'Pan-Dora' became a nickname for the couple. In 1950 "the couple resolved to accept the epithet as literary fate", and together embarked on a study of Pandora's box as a mythical symbol.

Dora Panofsky, whose life had been restricted by ill health since the mid-1940s, died in October 1965.

== Works ==
- 'Narcissus and Echo, Notes on Poussin's Birth of Bacchus in the Fogg Museum of Art', Art Bulletin, Vol. 3, No. 1 (June 1949), p. 112-20.
- (with Erwin Panofsky) Pandora's box: the changing aspects of a mythical symbol. Bollingen Series 53. New York: Pantheon Books, 1956.
- (with Erwin Panofsky) 'The iconography of the Galerie François Ier at Fontainebleau', Gazette des Beaux-Arts, Vol. 2, 1958
