= Hamburg School of Art History =

The so-called Hamburg School of Art History (Hamburger Schule der Kunstgeschichte) was a school of art historians primarily teaching at the University of Hamburg, who were closely connected with the Kulturwissenschaftliche Bibliothek Warburg (KBW) at the Warburg Haus, Hamburg. Its main members were scholars such as Aby Warburg, Erwin Panofsky, Fritz Saxl and Ernst Cassirer, who had been schooled to see images as cultural documents and inculcated in the investigation of pictorial types.

The Hamburg School of Art History is celebrated for the theoretical interpretations of subject matter known as iconography and iconology. It was soon established and attracted brilliant students such as Edgar Wind, Hugo Buchthal, Adolf Katzenellenbogen, Walter Horn, Charles de Tolnay, Ludwig Heinrich Heydenreich, Lotte Brand Philip, William S. Heckscher, Klaus Hinrichsen, Liselotte Müller and H. W. Janson. The School had also an influence on Ernst Kris's psychological interests.
