= Style and Medium in the Motion Pictures =

1936 essay by the art historian Erwin Panofsky

Style and Medium in the Motion Pictures is a 1936 essay by the art historian Erwin Panofsky. In the essay, Panofsky "seeks to describe the visual symptoms endemic" to the medium of film. Originally given as an informal talk in 1934 to a group of Princeton University students in the process of founding the film archive of the Museum of Modern Art in New York City, the essay was subsequently published in revised and expanded form in 1936, 1937, and 1947, and has been widely anthologized ever since. The essay was collected with "What Is Baroque?" and "The Ideological Antecedents of the Rolls-Royce Radiator" in the 1995 collection Three Essays on Style.

== Summary ==
Panofsky begins his essay by identifying two features that distinguish “film art” (see : art cinema) from preceding forms of art: first, film art was the only art whose beginnings were witnessed by people alive at the time of the essay’s composition (1934); second, whereas preceding arts were formed by “an artistic urge that gave rise to the discovery and gradual perfection of a new technique,” film was, alternatively, a “technical invention that gave rise to the discovery and gradual perfection of a new art.” Panofsky then establishes two “fundamental facts” about film: first, that the “primordial” appeal of films lay not in viewers’ interest in their subject matter or formal presentation of subject matter, but in their “sheer delight” of seeing moving things; second, that the film medium derived from folk art. Panofsky asserts that along with architecture, animation, and commercial design, film is one of the few visual arts that is “entirely alive,” and that it has “reestablished” a “dynamic contact between art production and art consumption” lacking in most other artistic fields.

Insisting that film originally drew its form in nineteenth-century painting, postcards, waxworks, comic strips, and its subject matter from popular songs, pulp magazines, and dime novels, Panofsky argues that the film medium originally “appealed directly and very intensely to a folk art mentality” by satiating its appetite for “justice and decorum,” violence, crude humor, and pornography. Despite failed attempts to legitimate the medium by importing literary values and theatrical techniques between 1905 and 1911, film art was, according to Panofsky, developed “by the exploitation of the unique and specific possibilities of the new medium”: the “dynamization of space” and the “spatialization of time." According to Panofsky, these qualities distinguished film from theater, as did the “principle of coexpressibility” which, during the sound era, entails the integration of the dialogue with the facial expressions of the actors framed in close-up shots.

Panofsky goes on to argue that the films produced between 1900 and 1910 established the subject matter and methods of the movies up to the essay’s publication. After illustrating his argument by discussing various examples from Hollywood cinema, Panofsky concludes by insisting that the requirement of communicability makes the commercial art of cinema more “vital” and “effective” than noncommercial art. Panofsky ultimately asserts that the cinema’s unique “problem is to manipulate and shoot unstylized reality in such a way that the result has style."
