= Guido of Siena =

13th-century Italian painter

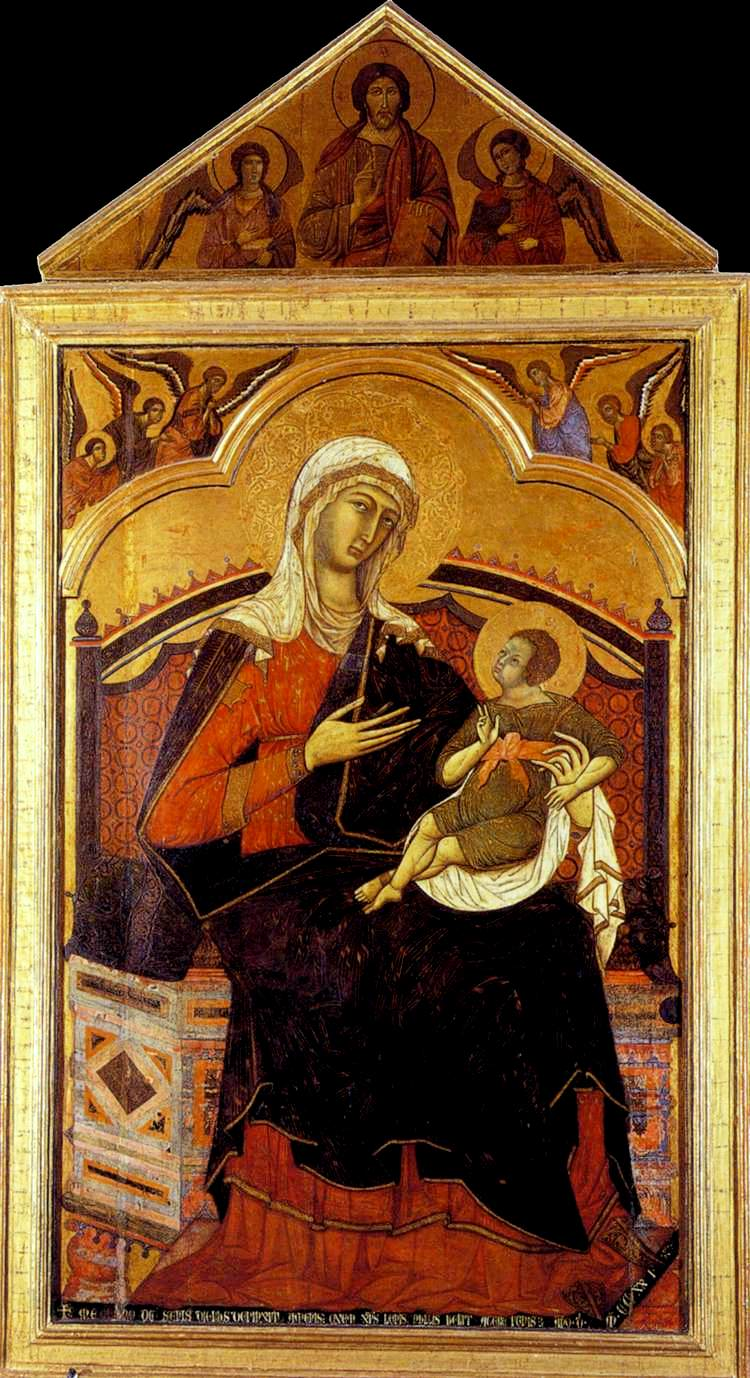
Enthroned Madonna of Guido of Siena, c. 1270–80

Guido of Siena, was an Italian painter, active during the 13th-century in Siena, and painting in an Italo-Byzantine style.

== Biography ==
The name Guido is known from the large panel in the church of San Domenico, Siena of the Virgin and Child Enthroned. The rhymed Latin inscription gives the painter's name as Guido de Senis, with the date 1221. However, this date cannot relate to the painting of the panel, which is usually dated on the basis of style to the 1270s. The faces of the Virgin and Child were scraped and repainted in the early 14th century in the manner of Duccio and so are not representative of Guido's original. A dossal featuring the Virgin and Child with four saints (accession No. 7) in the Siena Pinacoteca has an identical inscription, but unfortunately the name before "de Senis" has been cut off. It is very often assumed that the missing name is Guido, and gives us some indication of the original appearance of the Madonna at San Domenico.

Beyond this, little is known of Guido da Siena and his place in Sienese painting before Duccio. Because he is the only Sienese painter of the time to have surviving works on panels with a signature, he is often viewed as the most important artistic personality at the time and the first master of the great Sienese school of painting. However, Bellosi has attempted to associate some "Guidesque" works with the names Dietsalvi di Speme and Guido di Graziano, which are documented with the painting of Biccherna book covers for the Sienese commune in the 1270s. Some equate Guido as the father of Meo di Siena. One of his major historians that have studied Guido's works is James H. Stubblebine, along with Miklós Boskovits and Luciano Bellosi.

== Gallery ==
Selections from a series depicting the life of Christ

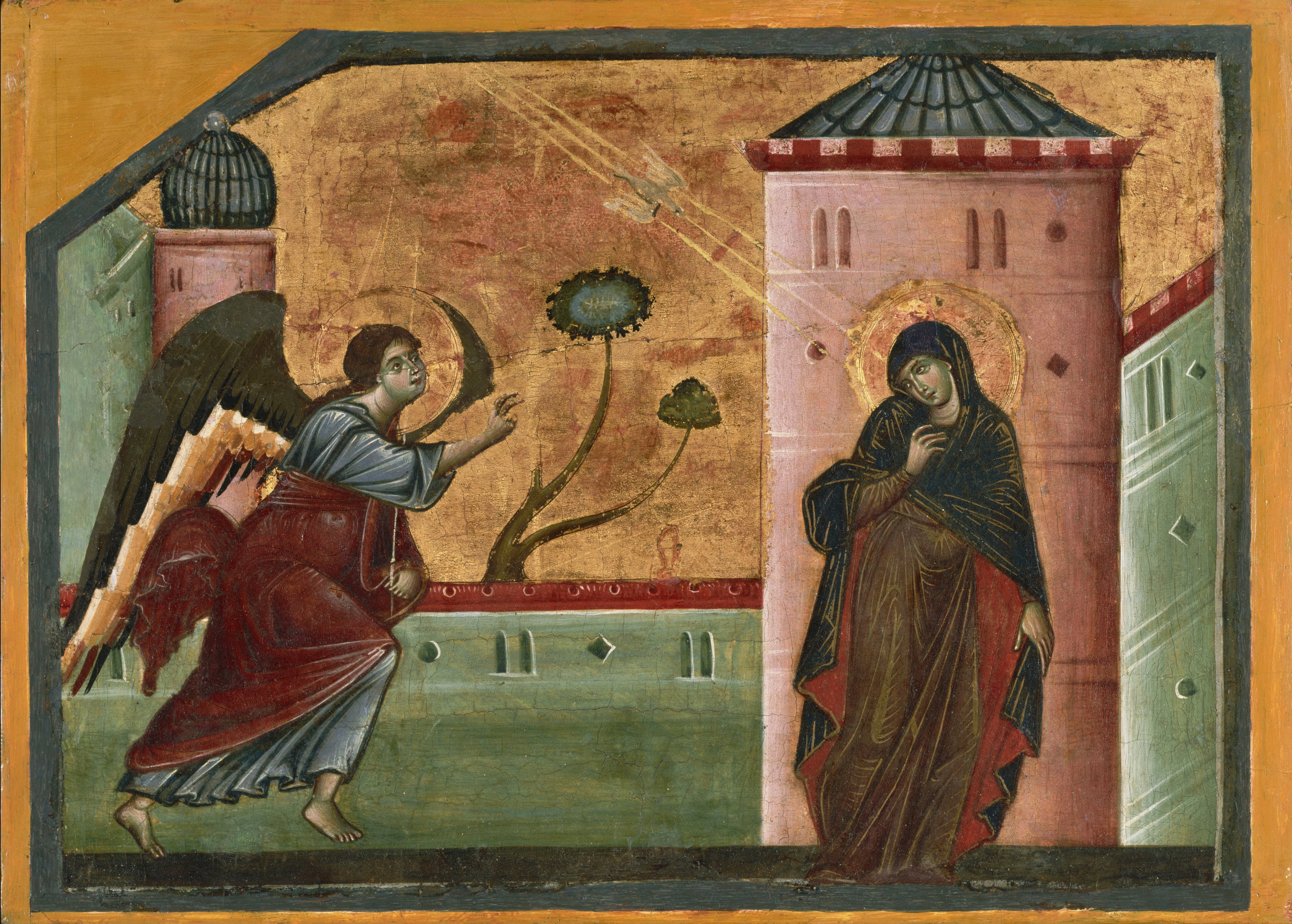
Annunciation, 1262–1279, in the Princeton University Art Museum

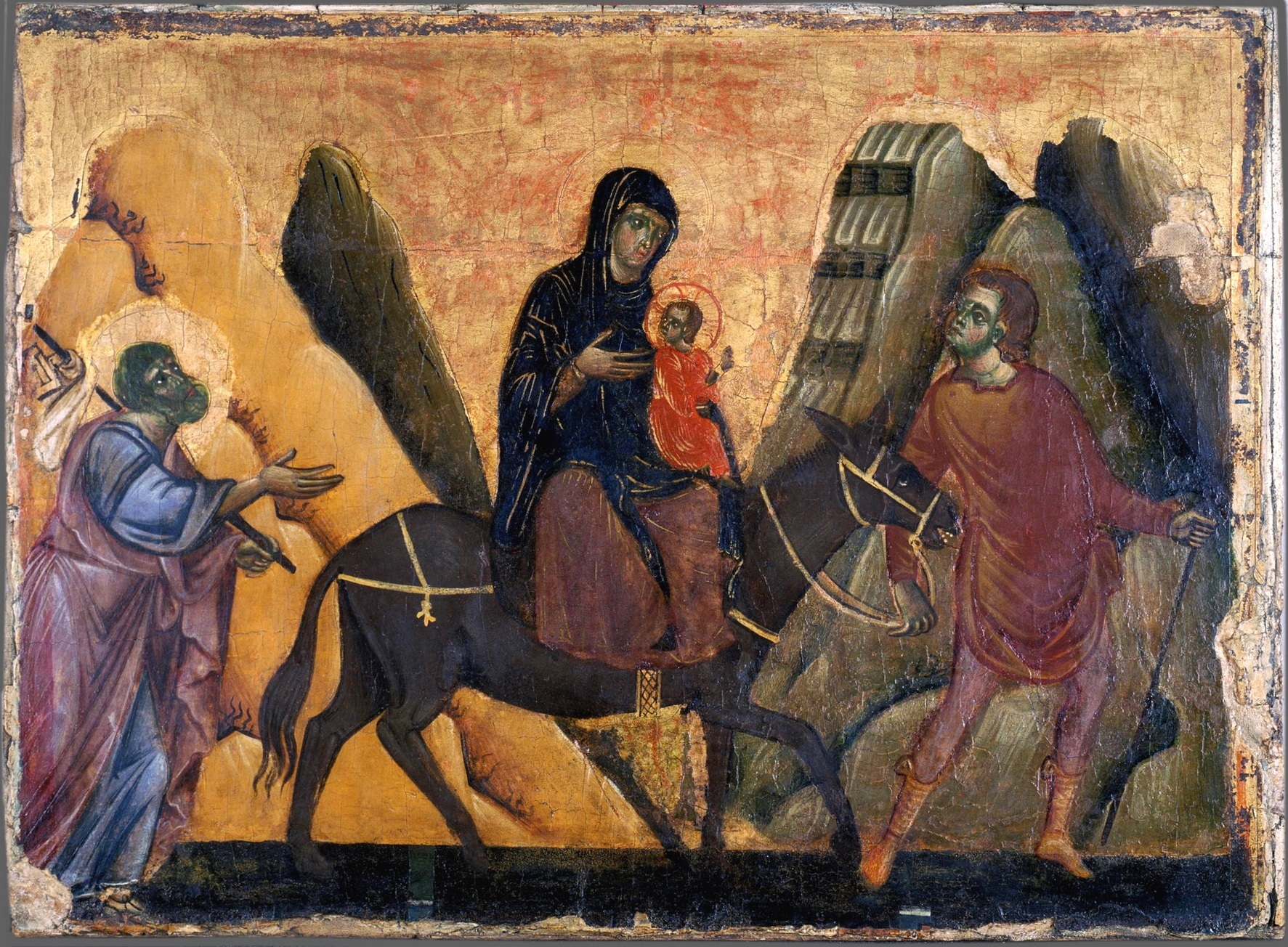
Flight into Egypt, 1270s, in the Lindenau-Museum

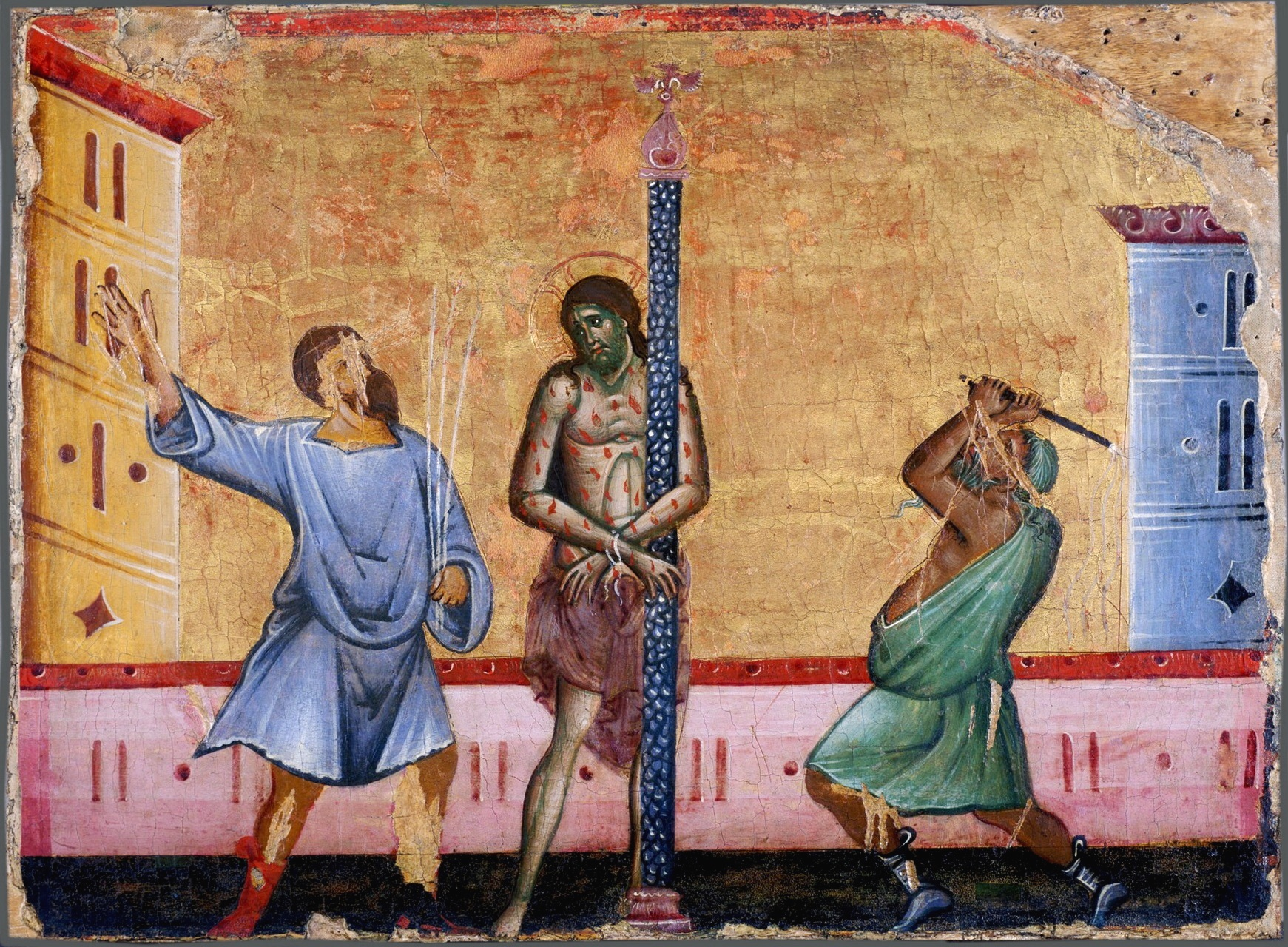
Flagellation, 1270s, in the Lindenau-Museum

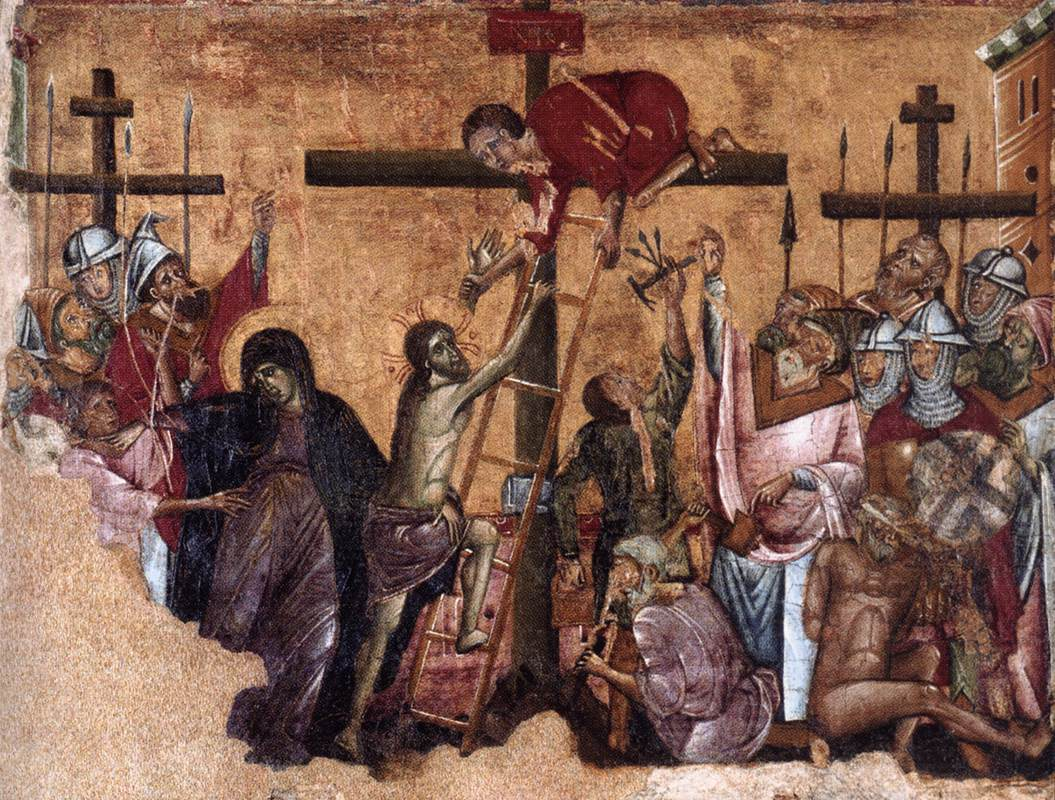
Christ Crucified, 1270s, in the Museum Catharijneconvent

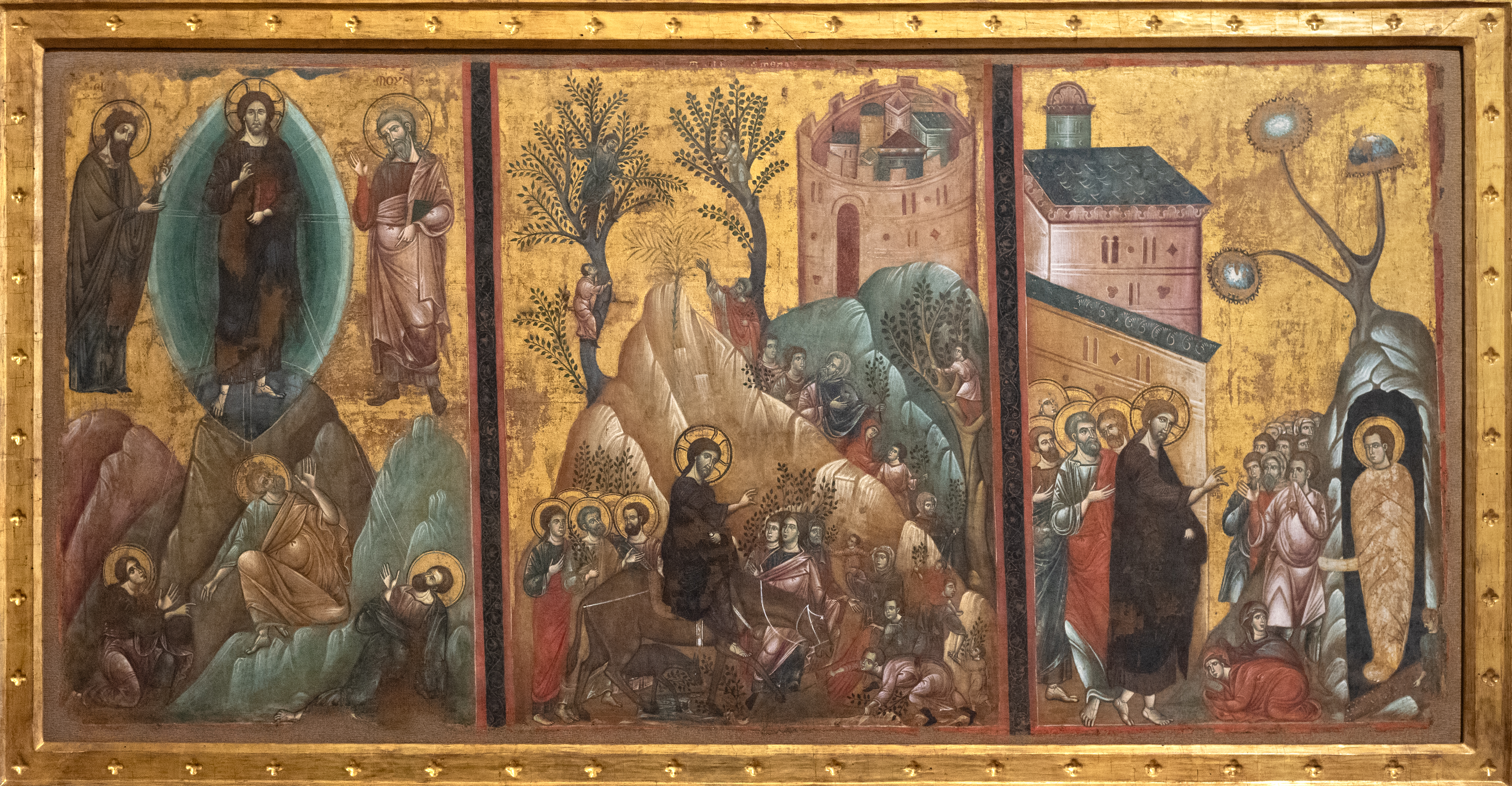
Transfiguration, entering Jerusalem, the resurrection of Lazarus. 1270.

== Sources ==
- Artcyclopedia - Guido da Siena
- Joanna Cannon. "Guido da Siena." Grove Art Online. Oxford Art Online.
- Hayden Maginnis "Everything in a name? Or the Classification of Sienese Duecento Painting" in Italian Panel Painting of the Duecento and Trecento V.M. Schmidt (ed.) (New Haven and London, 2002) pp. 471–485
- Luciano Bellosi "Per un contesto cimabuesco senese a) Guido da Siena e il probabile Dietisalvi" Propsettiva 61, 1991 pp. 6–20 and "Per un contesto cimabuesco senese b) Rinaldo da Siena e Guido di Graziano" Propsettiva 61, 1991, pp. 15–28
