= Kahler-Kreis =

Group of intellectuals

Kahler-Kreis (Kahler Circle) refers to the circle, lasting from 1939 to the early 1970s, of intellectual friends of Erich Kahler and his second wife, Alice (Lili or Lilly) Loewy Kahler. This group, named the "Kahler-Kreis" by Charles Greenleaf Bell (1916–2010), had its physical center at the Kahlers' house, One Evelyn Place in Princeton, New Jersey. Erich Kahler, a scholar, author, and lecturer, arrived in Princeton in 1939 as a financially destitute Jewish refugee from the Nazi regime. One Evelyn Place welcomed Jewish intellectual refugees from Europe and was filled with visitors, boarders, and cultural conversation. The Einstein family, Thomas Mann's family, and Hermann Broch were close friends of the Kahlers. The Kahler circle of friends also included Erwin Panofsky, Hetty Goldman, Ernst Kantorowicz, Kurt Gödel, and the painter Ben Shahn. Einstein preferred to visit the Kahlers when they had no other guests.

== Archival material related to the Kahler-Kreis ==
Alice Loewy Kahler (whose first husband was Paul Loewy, MD) was one of two daughters of Ignatz Pick (1870–1941), an art collector and successful art/antiques gallery owner in Vienna. She donated most of Erich Kahler's papers to the Princeton University Library. Another substantial bequest is at the Leo Baeck Institute, Center for Jewish History. The M. E. Grenander Department of Special Collections and Archives at the State University of Albany, New York, has 13 cubic feet (0.37 m^{3}) of items in its inventory of Erich (von) Kahler Papers, 1906–1968. In its Hermann Broch Archive, Yale University has about 300 items related to Erich Kahler. There are a few dozen items related to the Kahlers and the Kahler-Kreis at the Albert Einstein Archives, Hebrew University of Jerusalem.
