= Erich Kahler =

European-American literary scholar, essayist, and teacher (1885-1970)

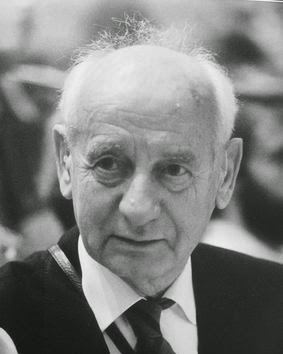
- Born: October 14, 1885; Prague
- Died: June 28, 1970 (aged 84); Princeton, New Jersey, US
- Occupation: Academic

Erich von Kahler (October 14, 1885 – June 28, 1970) was a mid-twentieth-century European-American literary scholar, essayist, and teacher known for works such as The Tower and the Abyss: An Inquiry into the Transformation of Man (1957).

Kahler was born to a Jewish family in Prague, then part of the Austro-Hungarian Empire. He studied philosophy, literature, history, art history, sociology, and psychology at the Ludwig-Maximilians-Universität München, the Friedrich Wilhelm University of Berlin, Heidelberg University, and the University of Freiburg before earning his doctorate at the University of Vienna in 1911. In 1912, he married his first wife, Josephine (née Sobotka). In 1933, deprived of his German citizenship by the Nazi regime, he left Germany, immigrating to the United States in 1938 after a period of residence in England. He became a U.S. citizen in 1944, where he was known as Erich Kahler.

In the U.S., he taught at The New School for Social Research, Black Mountain College, Cornell University, and Princeton University. He was a friend of Albert Einstein, Thomas Mann, and Hermann Broch, who wrote Tod des Vergils at Kahler's home, One Evelyn Place in Princeton. Kahler's friends became known as the Kahler-Kreis (Kahler Circle). Like Einstein, Kahler was a member of the Institute for Advanced Study. He met and married his second wife, Alice (Lili) Loewy, while in Princeton. Kahler's entire family was very close friends with Einstein. Kahler, his wife Alice, and his mother Antoinette von Kahler corresponded with Einstein.

Kahler's many books often take up political themes, in addition to the relation of society to technology and science. He was an ardent Zionist, advocated world government, and was also involved in antiwar and anti-nuclear activism. In 1968, he signed the “Writers and Editors War Tax Protest” pledge, vowing to refuse tax payments in protest against the Vietnam War.

Kahler died in 1970 at his home in Princeton, survived by his wife, Alice, and a stepdaughter, Hanna Loewy. Alice Loewy Kahler died in 1992.

Hanna Loewy Kahler exchanged letters with theoretical physicist David Bohm, with whom she was for some time engaged to be married, after he left the USA for Brazil and these, as well as other letters in her possession, have contributed to an understanding of historic events surrounding the Solvay Conference of 1927 and Bohm's exile in Brazil. She became a psychiatric social worker, and is credited to have helped to preserve the papers of Albert Einstein.

He was one of the signatories of the agreement to convene a convention for drafting a world constitution. As a result, for the first time in human history, a World Constituent Assembly convened to draft and adopt the Constitution for the Federation of Earth.

== Bibliography ==
- 1903: Books of poetry published
- 1916: Weltgesicht und Politik
- 1919: Das Geschlecht Habsburg
- 1920: Der Beruf der Wissenschaft
- 1936: Israel unter den Völkern
- 1937: Der deutsche Charakter in der Geschichte Europas
- 1943: Man the Measure: A New Approach to History
- 1944: The Arabs in Palestine (with Albert Einstein)
- 1952: Die Verantwortung des Geistes
- 1953: Editor: Hermann Broch, Gedichte
- 1957: The Tower and the Abyss
- 1960: Contributor: Symbolism in Religion and Literature
- 1962: Die Philosophie von Hermann Broch
- 1964: The Meaning of History
- 1964: Stefan George
- 1967: The Jews Among the Nations
- 1967: Out of the Labyrinth: Essays in Clarification (In the appendix of this book there is a reprint of "The Jews and the Arabs in Palestine: A Disputation with Philip K. Hitti" by Albert Einstein and Erich Kahler.)
- 1968: The Disintegration of Form in the Arts
- 1969: Orbit of Thomas Mann
- 1973: Die Verinnerung des Erzählens (The Inward Turn of Narrative) (posthumously)
- 1975: An Exceptional Friendship: The Correspondence of Thomas Mann and Erich Kahler
