= Friedrich Lippmann =

German art historian and director

Friedrich Lippmann (6 October 1838 in Prague – 2 October 1903 in Berlin) was a German art historian and director of the Kupferstichkabinett, Berlin State Museums, noted for his work on Dürer, Holbein and Italian 15th-century woodcuts. Max Jakob Friedländer, who was later to become a noted scholar of Early Netherlandish painting and the Northern Renaissance, worked under Lippmann in 1891 as a volunteer assisting with Lippmann's graphics collection.

== Selected publications ==
- Zeichnungen von Albrecht Dürer (Berlin: G. Grote, 1883–1929) [vols. 6-7 completed by Friedrich Winkler]
- The Art of Wood-engraving in Italy in the Fifteenth Century, 3 vols. (London: B. Quaritch, 1888)

== Other sources ==
Achenbach, S. (1996). Das Berliner Kupferstichkabinett und die französische Kunst unter Friedrich Lippmann und Max Lehrs.
