= Klara Steinweg =

German art historian

- Born: 18 May 1903; Westphalia, Germany
- Died: 10 June 1972 (aged 69); Meerbusch, Rhein-Kreis Neuss, North Rhine-Westphalia, Germany
- Occupation: Art historian

Klara Steinweg (1903–1972) was a German art historian, specializing in the Italian Renaissance.

She was a collaborator with Richard Offner on the Critical and Historical Corpus of Florentine Painting, from 1930 to 1965.

== Biography ==
Klara Steinweg was born on 18 May 1903 in Westphalia, Germany. She started her studies in 1922 under Heinrich Wölfflin in Munich, and later with Adolph Goldschmidt at the University of Berlin. By 1925, she was in Göttingen working on writing her dissertation on Andrea Orcagna under Georg Vitzthum von Eckstädt, which was published in 1929.

In 1930, she became an assistant to Richard Offner and moved to Berlin. She started her work on volume 4 of the book series Critical and Historical Corpus of Florentine Painting. In 1935, she moved to Florence to continue her work with Offner. With the outbreak of World War II (in 1939), where she remained until the end of the war, and she continued to work almost exclusively on the Offner project until 1965. She lived in Florence until her death in 1972.

Richard Offner died on 26 August 1965 in Florence, aged 76. His project then moved to the Kunsthistorisches Institut in Florenz, where Steinweg was appointed a co-author of the work. Miklós Boskovits and Mina Gregori continued the project work.

Steinweg died on 10 June 1972, aged 69, in Meerbusch, Rhein-Kreis Neuss, North Rhine-Westphalia, Germany.

== See also ==
- Women in the art history field
