= Panovsky =

Panovsky Пановский
- Settlement
- Location within Vladimir Oblast Location within Russia
- Coordinates: 55°19′N 41°44′E
- Country: Russia
- Region: Vladimir Oblast
- District: Melenkovsky District
- Time zone: UTC+3:00

Panovsky (Russian: Пановский) is a rural locality (a settlement) in Lyakhovskoye Rural Settlement, Melenkovsky District, Vladimir Oblast, Russia. The population was 14 as of 2010.

== Geography ==
Panovsky is located 7 km east of Melenki (the district's administrative centre) by road. Slavtsevo is the nearest rural locality.
