= Pief Panofsky =

American physicist (1919–2007)

Wolfgang K. H. Panofsky
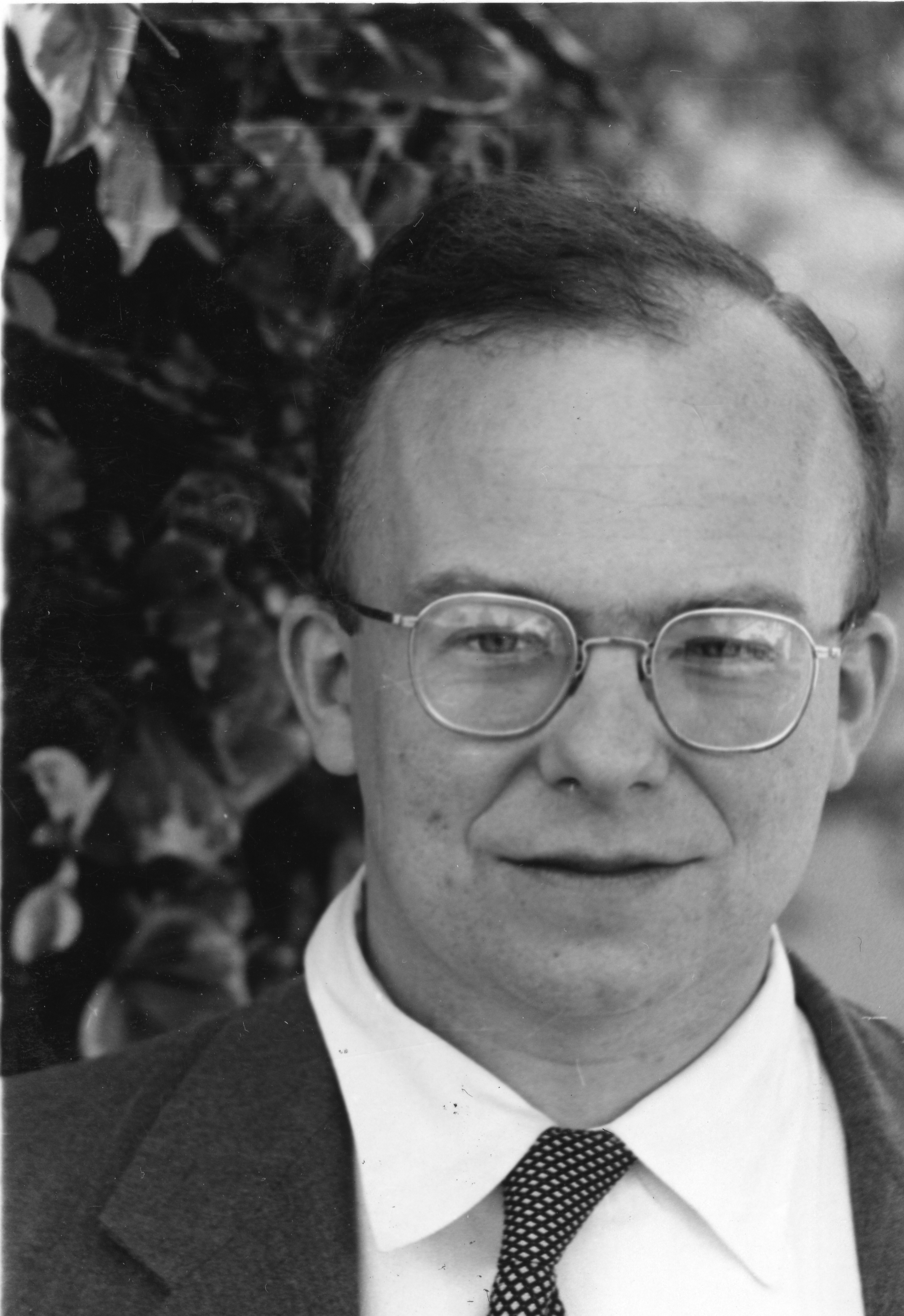
- Born: April 24, 1919; Berlin, Germany
- Died: September 24, 2007 (aged 88); Los Altos, California, U.S.
- Citizenship: Germany; United States
- Education: Princeton University (AB); California Institute of Technology (PhD)
- Known for: director of the Stanford Linear Accelerator Center
- Spouse(s): Adèle Irène DuMond (1923-2024; m. 1942); 5 children: Richard Jacob, Margaret Anne, Edward Frank, Carol Eleanor, Steven Thomas
- Parents: Erwin Panofsky; Dora Panofsky
- Awards: Ernest Orlando Lawrence Award (1961); National Medal of Science (1969); Franklin Medal (1970); Enrico Fermi Award (1979); Leo Szilard Award (1982)
- Scientific career
- Fields: Physics
- Workplaces: University of California, Berkeley, Stanford
- Doctoral advisor: Jesse DuMond
- Doctoral students: Cyrus Levinthal

Wolfgang Kurt Hermann "Pief" Panofsky (April 24, 1919 – September 24, 2007), was a German-American physicist who won many awards including the National Medal of Science.

== Early life ==
Panofsky was born in Berlin, Germany to a family of art historians Dorothea and Erwin Panofsky. His ancestors were of Jewish descent. He spent much of his early life in Hamburg, where his father was a professor of art history. From the age of 10, he attended the Johanneum, where he received a classical education involving Latin and Ancient Greek, but little science. At the age of 15, he moved with his family to the United States and entered Princeton University. He graduated with an A.B. in physics from Princeton University, as salutatorian of his class, in 1938 after completing a senior thesis, titled "The construction of a high pressure ionisation chamber", under the supervision of Walker Bleakney. He then received his Ph.D. in physics from the California Institute of Technology in 1942 after completing a doctoral dissertation, titled "A measurement of the value of h/e by the determination of the short wavelength limit of the continuous x-ray spectrum at 20 kV", under the supervision of Jesse W. M. DuMond. In April 1942 he was naturalized as a U.S. citizen.

== Academic career ==
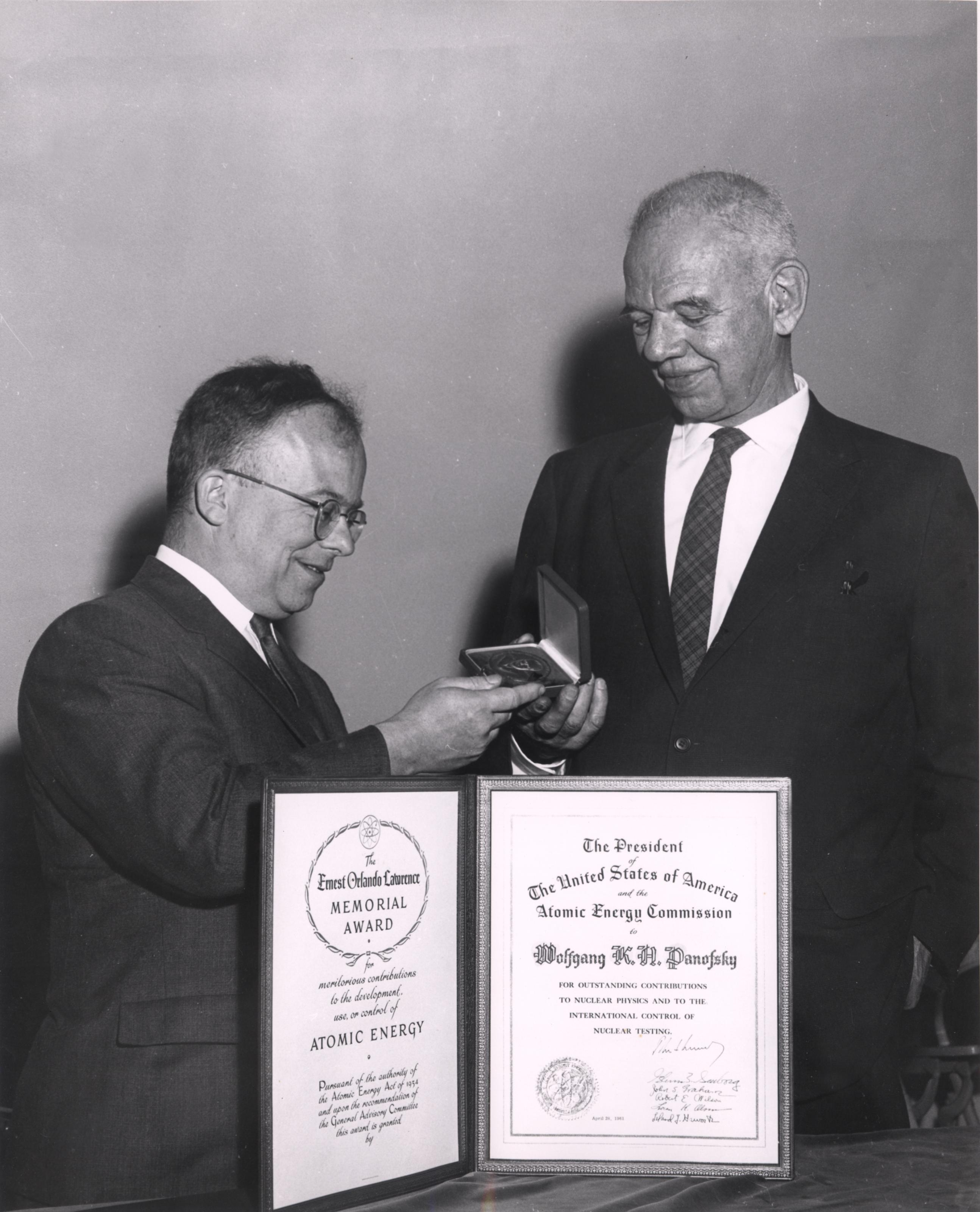
Panofsky (left) being awarded the E.O. Lawrence Award in 1961

From 1945 to 1951, Panofsky held an assistant and then associate professorship at the University of California, Berkeley, before permanently establishing himself as professor of physics at Stanford University. Between 1961 and 1984, he was the director of the Stanford Linear Accelerator Center and continued to serve as director emeritus until his death. He was also on the board of directors of the Arms Control Association from 1996 until 1999.

Panofsky was a member of the board of sponsors of The Bulletin of the Atomic Scientists and won the Matteucci Medal in 1996 for his fundamental contributions to physics. He was also a recipient of the National Medal of Science, the Franklin Medal (1970), the Ernest O. Lawrence Medal, the Leo Szilard Award and the Enrico Fermi Award.

== Personal life ==
During his college days, Panofsky was called "Pief" by fellow students who found his full name unpronounceable. The childhood nickname seemed to suit the ebullient physicist, and it stayed with him throughout his long life. His elder brother, Hans A. Panofsky, was "an atmospheric scientist who taught at Pennsylvania State University for 30 years and who was credited with several advances in the study of meteorology".

Panofsky married Adèle Irène DuMond, daughter of his PhD advisor, in 1942. Adèle Panofsky was also known at SLAC for her role in the building of the mounted Paleoparadoxia fossil skeleton display at the SLAC Visitors Center.

== Awards and honors ==
Panofsky has received the following rewards and honors:

- Ernest Orlando Lawrence Award (1961)
- California Institute of Technology Alumni Distinguished Service Award (1966)
- California Scientist of the Year Award (1967)
- Elected to the American Academy of Arts and Sciences (1968)
- National Medal of Science (1969)
- Franklin Medal (1970)
- Elected to the National Academy of Sciences (1971)
- Annual Public Service Award, Federation of American Scientists (1973)
- Enrico Fermi Award (1979)
- Leo Szilard Award (1982)
- Shoong Foundation Hall of Fame in Science (1983)
- Elected to the American Philosophical Society (1985)
- Hilliard Roderick Prize (AAAS-1991)
- Honorary doctorates from the Faculty of Mathematics and Science at Uppsala University, Sweden, from Princeton University, and from the University of Hamburg (1984)
- Matteucei Medal (Rome, 1997)
- International Scientific and Technological Award from the People's Republic of China (2001)
- Honorary Senator at the University of Hamburg (July 6, 2006)

== Death ==
Panofsky died at the age of 88 on September 24, 2007, in Los Altos, California, from a heart attack. Panofsky stayed active at SLAC until his last day of life. He was survived by his wife of 65 years, Adele Panofsky, their five children, 11 grandchildren and 3 great-grandchildren.

== Publications ==
- Classical Electricity and Magnetism by Wolfgang Panofsky and Melba Phillips (1955, 1962, 1983, 1990)

== See also ==
- Panofsky Prize
- Panofsky–Phillips equations
- Michael Schaaf und Hartwig Spitzer: Immediately after the explosion I fell asleep (PDF; 513 kB), Interview mit Wolfgang Panofsky, Arbeitsgruppe Naturwissenschaft und Internationale Sicherheit in der Universität Hamburg, 6. Juli 2006
- Wolfgang K. H. Panofsky, Panofsky on Physics, Politics, and Peace: Pief Remembers (New York: Springer, 2007)
- Guide to Wolfgang Kurt Hermann Panofsky Papers, 1932-2008 Collection, SLAC003, SLAC National Accelerator Laboratory, Stanford University.
- Oral history interview with MaryBeth Beerbohm on 2020 April 27, American Institute of Physics, Niels Bohr Library & Archives—MaryBeth Beerbohm was Panofsky's longtime secretary at SLAC.

Preceded by none	SLAC Director; 1961 – 1984	Succeeded by Burton Richter
