= Werner Weisbach =

German-Swiss art historian

- Born: September 1, 1873; Berlin, Kingdom of Prussia, German Empire
- Died: April 9, 1953 (aged 79); Basel, Switzerland
- Education: University of Freiburg; Leipzig University; Ludwig-Maximilians-Universität München
- Occupation: Art historian

Werner Weisbach (1 September 1873 in Berlin – 9 April 1953 in Basel) was a German-Swiss art historian.

He studied art history, archaeology, history and philosophy at the University of Freiburg, the Friedrich Wilhelm University of Berlin, the Ludwig-Maximilians-Universität München and Leipzig University, receiving his promotion from the latter institution in 1896 (doctoral advisor, August Schmarsow). Following a study trip through Europe, he served as a volunteer at the Museum of Berlin under the directorship of Wilhelm von Bode. From 1903 onward, he worked as a lecturer at the Friedrich Wilhelms University of Berlin, where from 1921 to 1933, he taught classes as an associate professor of art history. During the era of National Socialism he immigrated to Basel, Switzerland as a private scholar (1935).

== Selected works ==
- Impressionismus; ein problem der malerei in der antike und neuzeit (2 volumes, 1910–11) – Impressionism; a problem of painting in antiquity and modern times.
- Kriegsziele und deutscher idealismus, 1915 – War aims and German idealism.
- Der Barock als Kunst der Gegenreformation, 1921 – Baroque as an art of counterreformation.
- Die italienische Stadt der Renaissance, 1922 – The Italian city of the Renaissance.
- Kunst des Barock in Italien, Frankreich, Deutschland und Spanien, 1924 – Baroque art in Italy, France, Germany and Spain.
- Rembrandt, 1926 – On Rembrandt.
- In English: Spanish baroque art; three lectures delivered at the University of London, 1941.
- Manierismus in mittelalterlicher Kunst, 1942 – Mannerism in medieval art.
- Religiöse Reform und mittelalterliche Kunst, 1945 – Religious reform and medieval art.
- Vincent van Gogh; Kunst und Schicksal, 1949 – Vincent van Gogh, art and fate.
- Die Basler Buchillustration des XV. Jahrhunderts, 1957 – The Basler Buchillustration of the 15th century.
