= Donatell =

Donatell is a surname. Notable people with the surname include:

- Ed Donatell (born 1957), American football coach, father of Tommy
- Tommy Donatell (born 1989), American football coach
