= Erwin Panofsky =

German art historian (1892–1968)

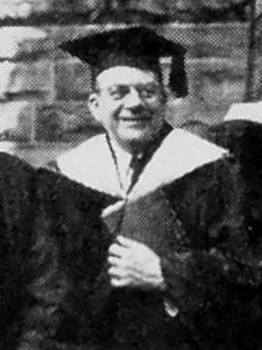
- Panofsky in 1950
- Born: March 30, 1892; Hanover, Germany
- Died: March 14, 1968 (aged 75); Princeton, New Jersey, US
- Spouse: Dorothea Mosse (m. 1916; died 1965)
- Children: 2, including Pief

Erwin Panofsky (March 30, 1892 – March 14, 1968) was a German art historian whose work helped establish modern iconography and iconology. His publications include Renaissance and Renascences in Western Art and Early Netherlandish Painting.

Panofsky's work emphasized the use of historical context to interpret artworks and visual culture. Several of his major studies remain in print, including Studies in Iconology: Humanist Themes in the Art of the Renaissance (1939), his 1943 study The Life and Art of Albrecht Dürer, and Meaning in the Visual Arts (1955). After the rise of the Nazi regime, he emigrated to the United States, where he pursued the remainder of his academic career.

== Life in Germany ==
=== Early life ===
Panofsky was born into a wealthy mining family on March 30, 1892, in Hanover, Germany. His parents, Arnold Panofsky and Caecilie (Solling) Panofsky, were from Upper Silesia. His Jewish family played a significant role in shaping his career as an art historian. He grew up in an environment that valued education, and was exposed to classical music and literature such as Dante's Divine Comedy, Shakespeare’s sonnets and the works of Johann Wolfgang von Goethe and Gotthold Ephraim Lessing. He did not observe Jewish religious customs as an adult, but remained proud of his heritage, sharing stories of his grandfather, a Talmud scholar.

=== College life ===
He received his Abitur in 1910 at the Joachimsthal Gymnasium. These years were particularly important to him, as he believed the humanistic education he received there was fundamental to his scholarly achievements. He entered Berlin University as a law student. During his first semester, he attended a lecture by Wilhelm Vöge on Albrecht Dürer and discovered an interest in art history.

During his studies, he attended courses by the art historians Heinrich Wölfflin, Edmund Hildebrandt, Karl Voll, Carl Frey, Werner Weisbach and Adolph Goldschmidt. When he was 19, he entered a competition held by the Grimm Foundation and won an award. The subject had been set by Wölfflin and Goldschmidt, who judged the entries. Panofsky's essay was entitled Dürer's Theory of Art, Primarily as it Relates to Italian Theory. A part of this paper was submitted as his doctoral dissertation at the University of Freiburg. The dissertation was published in 1915 as Die theoretische Kunstlehre Albrecht Dürers (Dürer's Art Theory). After a riding accident, Panofsky was exempted from military service during World War I. In the spring of 1917, he was considered fit for duty on the home front and was assigned government positions in Kassel and then Berlin, where he was responsible for distributing coal to civilians. He was demobilized in January 1919.

=== Teaching in Germany ===
In December 1918, while working in Berlin, Panofsky applied for habilitation at the University of Heidelberg, proposing to submit either his 1915 expanded Dürers Kunsttheorie vornehmlich in ihrem Verhältnis zur Kunsttheorie der Italiener or Der Westbau des Doms zu Minden. He withdrew the application in March 1919 for unexplained reasons. By August 1919, he shifted focus to the University of Tübingen but never finalized the thesis. Following Gustav Pauli's invitation in December 1919 to teach art history at the University of Hamburg, Panofsky agreed on the condition of simultaneously pursuing habilitation. By March 11, 1920, he formally submitted the completed first section of his study on Michelangelo’s stylistic development to the university’s Faculty of Philosophy, planning to complete the second part before the end of the year. Pauli, reviewing the thesis by March 20, privately advised Panofsky to secure housing in Hamburg, anticipating a favorable outcome. Despite Panofsky’s concerns over a three-month administrative silence, the evaluation process advanced: Pauli submitted his endorsement to the habilitation committee on May 10, 1920, and by June 3, committee members Max Lenz, Ernst Cassirer and Otto Lauffer had unanimously approved the application. The Faculty of Philosophy ratified the decision on June 19, scheduling Panofsky's Probevorlesung [de] (″trial lecture″) for July 3, 1920. Titled Die Entwicklung der Proportionslehre als Abbild der Stilentwicklung, the lecture successfully concluded his habilitation, granting him the venia legendi and securing his position at Hamburg. During this period, one of his early works was Idea: Ein Beitrag zur Begriffsgeschichte der älteren Kunstheorie (1924; translated into English as Idea: A Concept in Art Theory), based on the ideas of Ernst Cassirer.

However, shortly after his successful habilitation in July 1920, the manuscript vanished under unclear circumstances. Though on July 3, 1920, based on letter to Dora Panofsky, his wife at that time revealed plans to revise the text suggesting the work was still in his possession. Yet, by 1964, when Egon Verheyen inquired about the thesis after encountering its citation in an article by Gert van der Osten, Panofsky confirmed its loss, stating, “The original manuscript is lost”. It is assumed that the manuscript was lost after he moved his remaining belongings from Germany in 1943/44. Gerda Panofsky was unable to locate it, possibly because Ludwig Heinrich Heydenreich, who had studied under Panofsky, was in possession of the manuscript from 1946 to 1970, and brought it to Zentralinstitut für Kunstgeschichte, where the manuscript was found in its basement. In the Süddeutsche Zeitung, Willibald Sauerländer shed some light on the question of whether Heydenreich shared his recovery of the manuscript or not: "Panofsky has historically distanced himself from his early writings on Michelangelo, as he tired of the subject, and," according to Sauerländer "developed a professional conflict with Austro-Hungarian art historian Johannes Wilde, who accused Panofsky of not crediting him with ideas that Panofsky got from their conversation about Michelangelo drawings. Perhaps Panofsky didn't care about the whereabouts of his lost work and Heydenreich was not malicious in keeping it a secret ... but questions still remain." Then, the original 1920 manuscript of Panofsky's Habilitationsschrift, his second dissertation, which is titled Die Gestaltungsprinzipien Michelangelos, besonders in ihrem Verhältnis zu denen Raffaels ("The Composition Principles of Michelangelo, particularly in their relation to those of Raphael"), was found in August 2012 by art historian Stephan Klingen. The manuscript is published as book on 2014 with Gerda as the editor.

== Teaching in United States ==
Panofsky has already expressed interest in visiting America as early as 1929 on his correspondence with Fritz Saxl, and in 1930, he was invited by New York University (NYU) to serve as a Visiting Professor by recommendation from Goldschmidt . At that time, NYU's College of Fine Arts, which would later become the Institute of Fine Arts, was in the process of establishing America's first graduate department for art-historical research. By his participation, he helped Richard Offner and Walter William Spencer Cook to shape the department. Then, Panofsky was scheduled to teach during the Fall term of 1931-32, offering graduate-level courses along with a series of public lectures, all delivered in English.

During this first visit, Panofsky immersed himself in the scholarly environment of the East Coast, strengthening and expanding his American connections. He reconnected with Paul Sachs at Harvard delivering a lecture at the Fogg Museum. Panofsky had previously met Sachs in 1927 when Sachs visited Hamburg to inspect Aby Warburg’s Institute. He also visited Charles Rufus Morey, Alfred Barr, William J. Ivins and was introduced by Edward Warburg to a wealthy New York elite. Panofsky usually gave lectures at weekly salons hosted by Josephine Porter Boardman Crane which acquainted him with prominent figures such as the Rockefellers and the Straus family of Macy’s Department Store. This network will be beneficial when he later lost his position in Hamburg.

Following the success of his initial visit, Panofsky was considered for a return to the College of Fine Arts at NYU the following year. He managed to secure two additional twelve-week lecture courses for the spring of 1933 at the Metropolitan Museum of Art. Upon his return to America, Panofsky worked as an itinerant art historian, delivering lectures across the East Coast. With Adolf Hitler's appointment as Chancellor shortly after his arrival in New York, Panofsky expressed to Margaret Scolari Barr his relief at being in America, rather than witnessing the political crisis in Germany.

Although initially allowed to spend alternate terms in Hamburg and New York City, Panofsky’s appointment in Hamburg was terminated in 1933 after the Nazis came to power. This dismissal was due to his Jewish background. Panofsky faced limited employment opportunities outside of Germany, and the College of Fine Arts, due to a lack of funds, had not planned to invite him back after his spring lectureship. Cook could only offer Panofsky a single lecture course for the following year. With no immediate job prospects in America, Panofsky returned to his family in Hamburg, where conditions remained relatively safe at the time. Without teaching duties, he concentrated on his research and traveled to Belgium and France, including a visit to Henri Focillon, to explore future employment possibilities. Panofsky returned to New York in January 1934 to fulfill a temporary commitment to Cook and NYU, while Dora and their two young sons stayed in Hamburg.

Overwhelmed by his teaching and administrative duties at NYU, Panofsky lamented the lack of time for his own research and the prioritization of monetary concerns over scholarly pursuits. He expressed frustration to Margaret Barr about his extensive workload, including organizing syllabi, correcting test papers, and conducting numerous lectures and consultations. Although he appreciated Walter Cook's efforts in securing his position, he was critical of Cook's scholarly status and uncomfortable relying on financial support from New York's high society. Panofsky's dissatisfaction was further highlighted in a letter to Gertrud Bing, where he criticized the use of his seminar for NYU's publicity without his consent. Panofsky's first choice after 1933 was not to settle in America but to secure a position with the Warburg Library in London, which aligned to his humanistic expertise. Despite his efforts, those involved with the Library decided to help more disadvantaged exiled scholars.

His early visits to United States were financially motivated, as his NYU salary sustained his family’s rent in Hamburg. He disclosed this reason to Walter Friedländer. In a letter to Margaret Barr, he criticized American life as culturally “sterile” and critiqued U.S. academia: while he praised some Princeton graduate students, he derided NYU students as “stupid and ignorant.” During his 1934 return to NYU, his lectures were simplified for a paying public audience, leaving him feeling like a “workhorse.” NYU and Princeton University collaborated to provide him with paid work for two years. Cook secure a two-year Visiting Professorship for Panofsky at NYU in the fall of 1934 with a salary of $6000, while Morey arranged housing and schooling for Panofsky's family in Princeton in exchange for his teaching in the Department of Art and Archaeology. By this point, Panofsky had resolved never to return to Germany and was committed to establishing a permanent life in the United States.He finally secured a permanent position at the Institute for Advanced Study (IAS) in April 1935. The IAS, founded by Abraham Flexner in 1930, was unique in its mission to emphasize research and advanced teaching without the burden of administrative duties or introductory teaching responsibilities, which aligned with Panofsky's needs. Panofsky was recommended for a faculty position by Morey. Flexner offered Panofsky a generous salary of $10,000, allowing him to continue his collaboration with Morey at Princeton and utilize Morey's established Index of Christian Art.In 1935, he was awarded Honorary Doctorate by Utrecht University.

Because of his appointment to the IAS, NYU was able to hire Friedländer and Karl Lehmann Friedländer and Karl Lehmann. While in this position, he was traveling to Europe to research Flemish and fifteenth-century German painting and working with Emergency Committee in Aid of Displaced Foreign Scholars. He helped find work for displaced scholars— such as Richard G. Salomon, Ernst Kapp, Hans Baron and Kurt Wolff—by providing references and assisting with their CVs. He also gave temporary memberships at the IAS to Georg Swarzenski and Charles de Tolnay. Despite Panofsky's efforts to secure placements for his colleagues, he aware of the challenges posed by the ongoing Great Depression in America. Universities struggled with financial constraints and a lack of available jobs where the academic programs relied on rapidly decreasing temporary outside donations, leaving institutions like the College of Fine Arts unable to accommodate the large number of displaced art historians by 1937. In 1938, he relocated from the house arranged by Morey to a new residence on Battle Road in Princeton.In the same year, Panofsky started working on his book The History of Art as a Humanistic Discipline as part of the Spencer Trask Lectures at 'The Meaning of the Humanities' symposium, held in Princeton at the invitation of the French philosopher Theodore Meyer Greene. Around that same time, he was preparing his book Studies in Iconology: Humanist Themes in the Art of the Renaissance for his 1937 Mary Flexner Lectures at Bryn Mawr College, at the invitation of Marion Edwards Park.

He was part of the Kahler-Kreis American Academy of Arts and Sciences, the American Philosophical Society, the British Academy by geting Fellow of the British Academy. In 1954 he became foreign member of the Royal Netherlands Academy of Arts and Sciences. In 1962 he received the Haskins Medal of The Medieval Academy of America. In 1947–1948 Panofsky was the Charles Eliot Norton professor at Harvard University; the lectures later became Early Netherlandish Painting.

He became particularly well known for his studies of symbols and iconography in art. First in a 1934 article, then in his Early Netherlandish Painting (1953), Panofsky was the first to interpret Jan van Eyck's Arnolfini Portrait (1934) as not only a depiction of a wedding ceremony, but also a visual contract testifying to the act of marriage. Panofsky identifies a plethora of hidden symbols that all point to the sacrament of marriage. In recent years, this conclusion has been challenged, but Panofsky's work with what he called "hidden" or "disguised" symbolism is still very much influential in the study and understanding of Northern Renaissance art. Similarly, in his monograph on Dürer, Panofsky gives lengthy "symbolic" analyses of the prints Knight, Death, and the Devil and Melencolia I, the former based on Erasmus's Handbook of a Christian Knight.

Panofsky was known to be a friend with physicists Wolfgang Pauli and Albert Einstein. His younger son, Wolfgang K. H. Panofsky, became a renowned physicist who specialized in particle accelerators. His elder son, Hans A. Panofsky, was "an atmospheric scientist who taught at Pennsylvania State University for 30 years and who was credited with several advances in the study of meteorology". As Wolfgang Panofsky related, his father used to call his sons "meine beiden Klempner" ("my two plumbers"). William S. Heckscher was a student, fellow emigre, and close friend. In 1973 he was succeeded at Princeton by Irving Lavin. Erwin Panofsky has been recognized as both a "highly distinguished" professor at the Institute for Advanced Study, Princeton, New Jersey, and in Jeffrey Chipps' biography of the subject as "the most influential art historian of the twentieth century". In 1999, the new "Panofsky Lane", in that Institute's faculty housing complex, was named in his honor.

== Iconology ==
Panofsky was the most eminent representative of iconology, a method of studying the history of art created by Aby Warburg and his disciples at the Warburg Institute in Hamburg. There, a personal and professional friendship linked him to Fritz Saxl in collaboration with whom he produced a large part of his work.

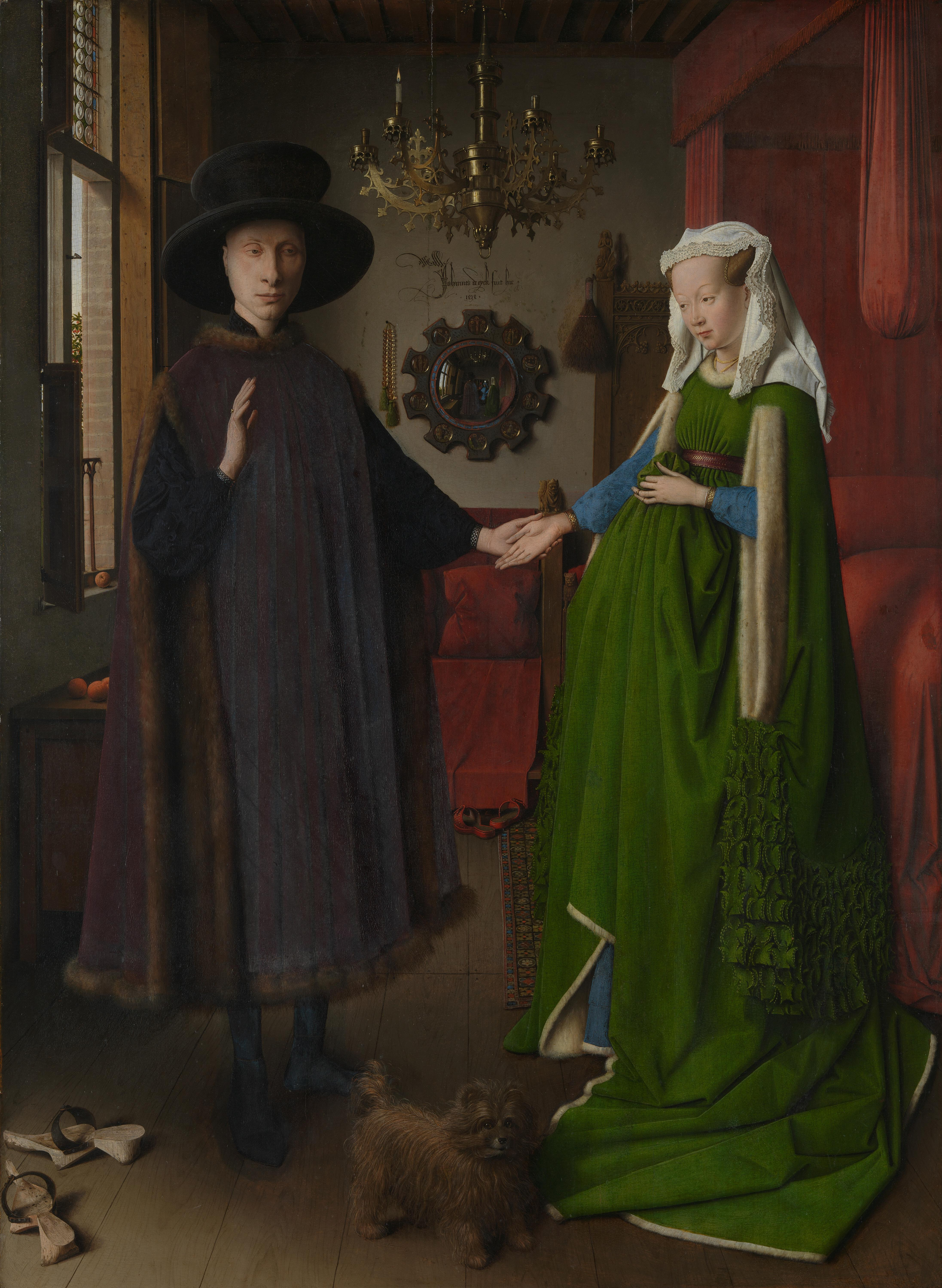
Panofsky made important contributions to the study of iconography and iconology, including his interpretation of Jan van Eyck's Arnolfini Portrait (1434).

=== Three strata of subject matter or meaning ===
In his book Studies in Iconology, first published in 1939, he details his idea of three levels of art-historical understanding:

- Primary or natural subject matter: The most basic level of understanding, this stratum consists of perception of the work's pure form. Take, for example, a painting of the Last Supper. If we stopped at this first stratum, such a picture could only be perceived as a painting of 13 men seated at a table. This first level is the most basic understanding of a work, devoid of any added cultural knowledge.
- Secondary or conventional subject matter (iconography): This stratum goes a step further and brings to the comparison of cultural and iconographic knowledge. For example, a Western viewer would understand that the painting of 13 men around a table would represent the Last Supper. Similarly, a representation of a haloed man with a lion could be interpreted as a depiction of St. Mark.
- Tertiary or intrinsic meaning or content (iconology): This level takes into account personal, technical, and cultural history into the understanding of a work. It looks at art not as an isolated incident, but as the product of an historical environment. Working in this stratum, the art historian can ask questions like "why did the artist choose to represent The Last Supper in this way?" or "Why was St. Mark such an important saint to the patron of this work?" Essentially, this last stratum is a synthesis; it is the art historian asking "what does it all mean?"

For Panofsky, it was important to consider all three strata as one examines Renaissance art. Irving Lavin says "it was this insistence on, and search for, meaning — especially in places where no one suspected there was any — that led Panofsky to understand art, as no previous historian had, as an intellectual endeavor on a par with the traditional liberal arts."

The method of iconology, which had developed following Erwin Panofsky, has been critically discussed since the mid-1950s, in part also strongly (Otto Pächt, Svetlana Alpers). However, among the critics, no one has found a model of interpretation that could completely replace that of Panofsky.

As regards the interpretation of Christian art, that Panofsky researched throughout his life, the iconographic interest in texts as possible sources remains important, because the meaning of Christian images and architecture is closely linked to the content of biblical, liturgical and theological texts, which were usually considered authoritative by most patrons, artists and viewers.

=== Style and the Film Medium ===
In his 1936 essay "Style and Medium in the Motion Pictures", republished by Lavin in 1995 (Three Essays on Style), Panofsky seeks to describe the visual symptoms endemic" to the medium of film.

== Legacy ==
In 1993 Joan Hart wrote that, "Erwin Panofsky is the most influential art historian of the twentieth century." In 2016 Stephen Mack wrote that, "Whether one agrees or disagrees with him, Panofsky is the one art historian who all others must confront, even now, almost 50 years since his death."

In 2016, the Zentralinstitut für Kunstgeschichte (Central Institute for Art History) in Munich founded the "Panofsky-Professur" (Panofsky Professorship). The first professors have been Victor Stoichita (2016), Gauvin Alexander Bailey (2017), Caroline van Eck (2018), and Olivier Bonfait (2019). His work has greatly influenced the theory of taste developed by French sociologist Pierre Bourdieu, in books such as The Rules of Art and Distinction. In particular, Bourdieu first adapted his notion of habitus from Panofsky's Gothic Architecture and Scholasticism, having earlier translated the work into French.

== Works ==
A first comprehensive bibliography on the writings of Erwin Panofsky was published in the Festschrift edited by Millard Meiss in 1961. Almost all texts are accessible online, see references.

- Idea: A Concept in Art Theory (1924)
- Perspective as Symbolic Form (1927). Lectures held at the Warburg Institute in Hamburg, 1924–25.
- Studies in Iconology (1939)
- The Life and Art of Albrecht Dürer (1943)
- Abbot Suger on the Abbey Church of St.-Denis and Its Art Treasures, edited, translated, and annotated by Erwin Panofsky (1946). Based on the Norman Wait Harris lectures delivered at Northwestern University in 1938.
  - Updated 2nd edition by Gerda Panofsky-Soergel (1979)
- Gothic Architecture and Scholasticism (1951)
- Early Netherlandish Painting: Its Origins and Character (1953). Based on the 1947–48 Charles Eliot Norton Lectures.
- Meaning in the Visual Arts. Papers in and on Art History (1955)
- Pandora's Box: the Changing Aspects of a Mythical Symbol (1956), with Dora Panofsky
- Renaissance and Renascences in Western Art (1960)
- Tomb Sculpture: Its Changing Aspects from Ancient Egypt to Bernini (1964), with H. W. Janson
- Saturn and Melancholy: Studies in the History of Natural Philosophy, Religion, and Art (1964), with Raymond Klibansky and Fritz Saxl
- Problems in Titian, Mostly Iconographic (1969) The Wrightsman Lectures of the New York University Institute of Fine Arts delivered at the Metropolitan Museum of Art.

=== Posthumous ===
- Three Essays on Style (1995): "What Is Baroque?" (prev. unpubl.), "Style and Medium in the Motion Pictures" (1936, as "On Movies", rev. in 1947), "The Ideological Antecedents of the Rolls-Royce Radiator" (1963). Edited and introduced by Irving Lavin, with a memoir by William S. Heckscher.
- "The Mouse That Michelangelo Failed to Carve" (1964)
- "Carmina Latina" (2018), edited with introduction and short annotations by Gereon Becht-Jördens
