= Max Jakob Friedländer =

German curator and art historian

Max Jakob Friedländer

Max Jakob Friedländer (5 July 1867 in Berlin – 11 October 1958 in Amsterdam) was a German-Jewish museum curator and art historian. He was a specialist in Early Netherlandish painting and the Northern Renaissance, who volunteered at the Kupferstichkabinett Berlin in 1891 under Friedrich Lippmann. On Lippmann's recommendation, Wilhelm von Bode took him on as his assistant in 1896 for the paintings division. He was appointed deputy director of the Kaiser Friedrich Museum (then containing the Berlin State Museums' old master paintings and sculpture) under Bode in 1904 and became director himself from 1924 to 1932, working on his history From Van Eyck to Bruegel and the 14-volume (printed in 16, with supplements) survey Early Netherlandish Painting. In 1933 he was dismissed as a "non-Aryan" and in 1939 had to move to Amsterdam because he was Jewish. He attained the rank and title of geheimrat (privy councillor) under the German Empire. He also donated several works to the collection and worked in the art trade as an advisor, to Hermann Göring among others.

He invented the style term Antwerp Mannerism, and created many of the notnames for undocumented artists in this style, and others of the period.

He should not be confused with the German-American art historian Walter Friedländer; they were not related.

== Approach to art history ==
Friedländer's approach to art history was essentially that of a connoisseur. He gave priority to a critical reading based on sensitivity rather than on grand artistic and or aesthetic theories. He described it as follows:

If the determination of the authorship of an individual work of art most certainly is not the ultimate and highest task of artistic erudition; even if it were no path to the goal: nevertheless, without a doubt, it is a school for the eye, since there is no formulation of a question which forces us to penetrate so deeply the essence of an individual work as that concerning the identity of the author. The individual work, rightly understood, teaches us what a comprehensive knowledge universal artistic activity is incapable of teaching us.

His career was marked by a disdain for the Vienna School of Art History, typical of Berlin. He tended to emphasize the Germanic character of Early Netherlandish art, a term he helped to invent, rather than either its links to French-speaking territories, or its individual local character. This at times took him into tropes on racial character typical of German Nationalism in the decades around 1900. His later writings, in particular Early Netherlandish Painting to some extent climbed down from the positions taken earlier.

== Photo archive ==
During his lifetime he took high quality photographs of artwork wherever he travelled. His personal archive with approximately 15,000 photos and reproductions of 15th- and 16th-century paintings from the North and South Netherlands are often accompanied with notes including such things as the provenance, attribution, relative condition, and location of the paintings. The majority of his work has been transcribed and digitised in the RKDimages database of the Dutch National Institute of Art History (RKD) and forms an important open access archive for art historians.

== Publications ==
- Meisterwerke der niederländischen Malerei des 15. und 16. Jahrhunderts, 1903 (Masterpieces of Netherlandish painting of the 15th and 16th centuries).
- Von Jan van Eyck bis Bruegel, 1916 (From Jan van Eyck to Bruegel)
- A. Dürer, 1923
- Die altniederländische Malerei, 1924–37. In English Early Netherlandish Painting; his major work, printed in 16 volumes
- Echt und unecht, 1929 (Real and unreal)
- Von Kunst und Kennerschaft, 1946 (On art and connoisseurship)
- Essays über die Landschaftsmalerei, 1947 (Essays on landscape painting)
- Early Netherlandish Painting, vol. VII, Leiden and Brussels, 1972
