= Adolph Goldschmidt =

German Jewish art historian

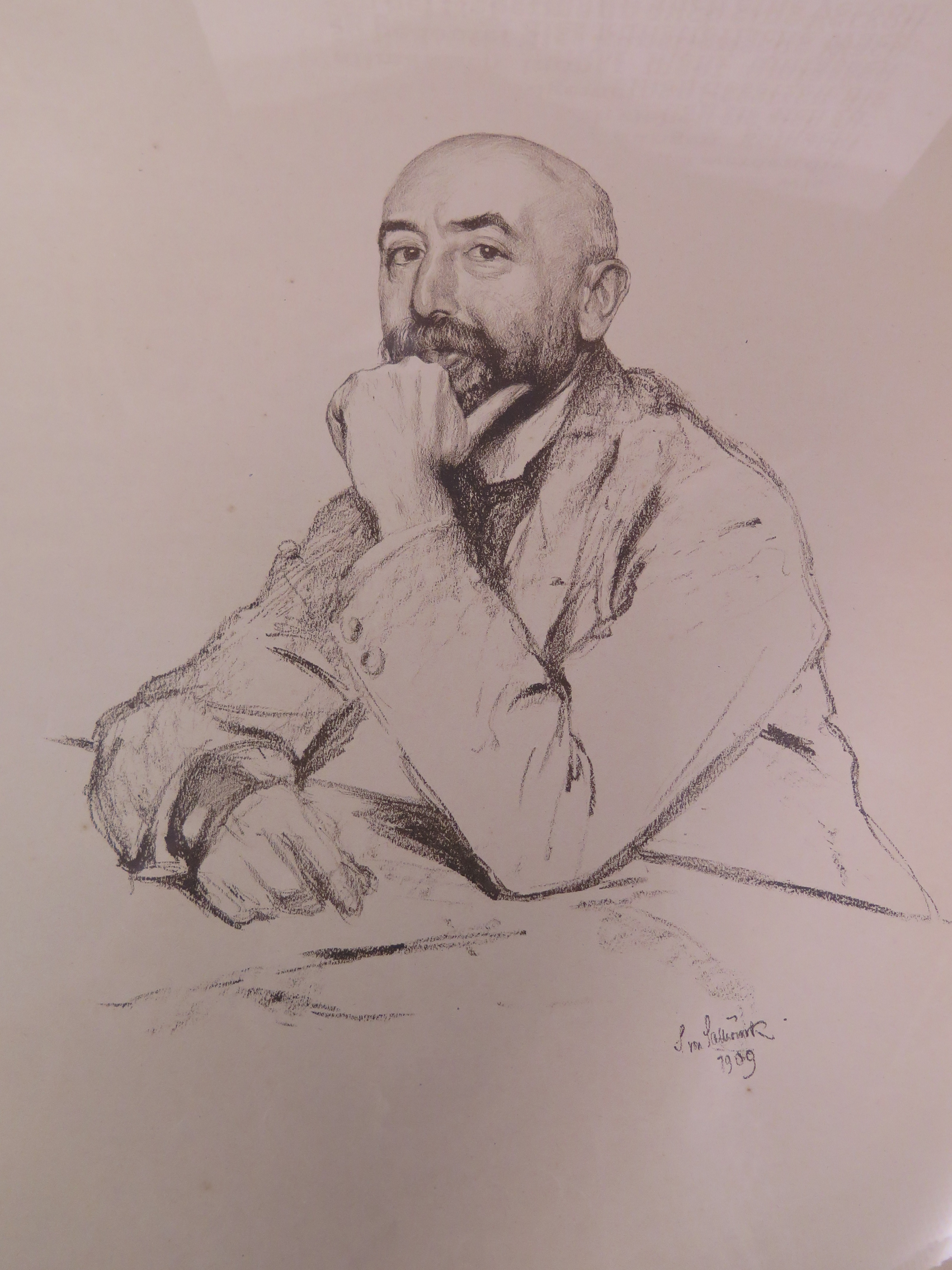
Portrait of Adolph Goldschmidt (1909), by Sigmund von Sallwürk

Adolph Goldschmidt (15 January 1863 – 5 January 1944) was a Jewish German art historian. He taught at University of Berlin from 1892 to 1903, and University of Halle from 1904 to 1912.

== Biography ==
He was born on 15 January 1863 in the Free and Hanseatic City of Hamburg. His family was Jewish and in the banking business. After a short business career he devoted himself (1885) to the study of the history of art at the universities of Jena, Kiel, and Leipzig. He took his degree in 1889 with the dissertation, Lübecker Malerei und Plastik bis 1530 (English: Lübeck painting and sculpture until 1530), the first detailed analysis of the medieval art of northeast Germany.

After traveling through Germany, Denmark, Sweden, the Netherlands, England, France, and Italy, on the presentation of his work Der Albanipsalter in Hildesheim und Seine Beziehung zur Symbolischen Kirchenskulptur des 12. Jahrhunderts (English: The Albans Psalter in Hildesheim and Its Relationship to the Symbolic Church Sculpture of the 12th Century) (1895), he became Privatdozent at the University of Berlin. Notable students of Goldschmidt include Klara Steinweg.

His work, Studien zur Geschichte der Sächsischen Skulptur in der Uebergangszeit vom Romanischen zum Gotischen Stil (English: Studies on the history of Saxon sculpture in the transition period from the Romanesque to the Gothic style) (Berlin, 1902) traces the gradual development of German sculpture with reference to the period of its florescence in the thirteenth century. His work, Die Kirchenthür des Heil. Ambrosius in Mailand (English: The church door of salvation. Ambrose in Milan) (1902) for the first time showed the door of the Basilica of Sant'Ambrogio in Milan to be a monument of early Christian art. He also contributed a number of important articles on North-German painting, Saxon sculpture, and early medieval miniature manuscripts to the Repertorium für Kunstwissenschaft, Zeitschrift für Christliche Kunst, and Jahrbuch der Kgl. Preussischen Kunstsammlungen.

Being of Jewish origin, he had to flee Nazi Germany. He died in Basel, Switzerland on 5 January 1944, aged 80.
