= William S. Heckscher =

American art historian

William S. Heckscher (1904–1999) was a German art historian and professor of fine art and art history at universities in the United States, Canada, and the Netherlands.

== Early life and education ==
Wilhelm Sebastian Martin Hugo Heckscher was born in Hamburg, Germany, on December 14, 1904. He was the son of Hulda Foerster and Siegfried Heckscher, a lawyer and director of the Hamburg America Line. His maternal grandfather was the astronomer and mathematician Wilhelm Foerster.

From 1918 to 1921, the family lived in the Netherlands while Heckscher's father served as the Weimar Republic's ambassador to The Hague; there, Heckscher enrolled at the Nederlandsch Lyceum. Heckscher pursued his interests in history and Flemish art by spending his off hours studying at the Dutch Royal Library, the Mauritshuis and the Kröller-Müller Museum, but was dismissed from the Lyceum in 1920 for "lack of scholarly potential". After the family returned to Hamburg, Heckscher attended the city's Kunstgewerbeschule, now the Hochschule für bildende Künste Hamburg, but failed a class in ceramics.

Having been stymied at furthering his formal art education, at the age of 19 Heckscher returned to The Hague and worked as a portrait painter. He spent months copying panels by Jan van Eyck and Konrad Witz, took informal painting lessons with Ludwig Bartning of the Berlin Academy, and was contracted to work on an anatomical atlas. His portraiture was in demand among Dutch, German, and Belgian patrons; this was his means of support from 1924 to 1930. (Note: Few of his paintings from this period survive, but an exhibition of his later paintings and drawings was held in Durham, North Carolina in 1967. See Bunker, Cameron and Heckscher, William S. "A Catalogue of Drawings and Prints by William S. Heckscher," Allied Arts Center and Durham Art Guild (1967) OCLC 497773642.)

Heckscher was commissioned in 1931 to paint a portrait of Gustav Pauli, the director of Kunsthalle Hamburg. While at work in Pauli's office, they were interrupted by a strange little man unknown to Heckscher. The man, apparently a colleague of Pauli, immediately launched into some Dürer problem that was troubling him. The stranger's animated discussion with Pauli left Heckscher astounded at the depth of the man's insight. Intrigued, Heckscher followed Erwin Panofsky to his office and all but begged to study under him. Panofsky was thoroughly unimpressed by Heckscher's education—he had never finished high school—but Heckscher persisted, and Panofsky eventually relented, telling him of a program to support gifted students who had not completed high school. Heckscher passed the rigorous examination (Note: Of the 182 applicants at the time, he was in fact the only student to pass.) and was accepted into the University of Hamburg, but was only grudgingly given a seat in the back of Panofsky's seminar.

In 1932–1933, Heckscher lived in New York where he worked as Panofsky's assistant. During this time, he enrolled in the Graduate Department of Art History at the Institute of Fine Arts at New York University to study American art history. Heckscher returned to Germany to continue his studies in 1934. He and his mother were detained by the Gestapo and interrogated for ten days after being accused of having pacifist connections.

He received his PhD from the University of Hamburg in 1936. Panofsky had moved to the Institute for Advanced Study, and Heckscher followed him to Princeton as a visiting art historian. Heckscher also studied English there, and took up a study of linguistics the following year after moving to London.

In 1940, Heckscher was detained in London as an enemy alien. He was sent to an internment camp in Farnham, Quebec, where he was held for eighteen months. During this time, he organized an informal prison school to help foreign internees prepare for university entrance examinations. (Note: In recognition of his work at Farnham camp during the war, Heckscher was awarded an honorary degree in 1981 by McGill University.) Heckscher was released from internment early, on Christmas Day 1941, after the intervention of Canadian senator Cairine Wilson and John Lovejoy Elliott. (Note: John Lovejoy Elliott was the senior member of the New York Society for Ethical Culture; he came to Heckscher's aid out of respect for his grandfather Wilhelm Foerster, a pacifist who had been a founding member of the German Society for Ethical Culture. See Sears, p. 123)

== Career ==
Heckscher briefly taught art at the University of Toronto, then from 1942 to 1946 taught the German language and phonetics at Carleton College, the University of Saskatchewan, and the University of Manitoba. He moved to the United States in 1947 to teach art history at the University of Iowa. In 1955 he was named Professor of Medieval Art and Iconology for the Institute of Art History at the University of Utrecht, a position he would hold for the following ten years.

In 1966 he was appointed chair of the art history department at Duke University, where he was the Benjamin N. Duke Professor. As director of the Duke University Museum of Art from 1970 to 1974, Heckscher coordinated the acquisition of the Brummer collection of medieval and Renaissance sculpture. Heckscher retired from Duke in 1974, and moved with his family to Princeton, where he continued his scholarly research and served as an advisor to the Princeton University Library's Department of Rare Books. He died on November 27, 1999, at his home in Princeton.

=== Selected works ===
- 1936. "Die Romruinen: Die geistigen Voraussetzungen ihrer Wertung im Mittelalter und in der Renaissance." University of Hamburg.
- 1947. "Bernini's Elephant and Obelisk." Art Bulletin, Volume 29, No. 3, p. 155–182
- 1958. Rembrandt's Anatomy of Dr. Nicolaas Tulp. New York: New York University Press. ASIN B001SDC3RQ
- 1964. "The Genesis of Iconology," in Stil und Überlieferung in der Kunst des Abendlandes, Akten des XXI Internationalen Kongresses für Kunstgeschichte. Vol. 3, p. 239–262
- 1966. "Sturm und Drang: Conjectures on the Origin of a Phrase." Simiolus: Netherlands Quarterly for the History of Art, Vol. 1, No. 2, p. 94–105
- 1968. "The Annunciation of the Merode Altarpiece: An Iconographic Study" in Miscellanea Josef Duverger, Vol. 1. Ghent: Association for the History of Textile Arts.
- 1969. "Erwin Panofsky: A Curriculum Vitae," Record of the Art Museum, Princeton University, Vol. 28, No. 1, Erwin Panofsky: In Memoriam, p. 4–21. JSTOR 3774408
- 1985. Art and Literature: Studies in Relationship. Duke University Press. ISBN 978-3873204171
- 1989. The Princeton Alciati Companion: A Glossary of Neo-Latin Words and Phrases used by Andrea Alciati and the Emblem Book Writers of his Time. New York: Garland. ISBN 978-0824037154

=== Recognition ===
Heckscher was one of nine prominent art historians, most of them refugees from the Nazi regime, who—in the words of Art Journal—"made 'art history' and 'Germanic' interchangeable terms in universities throughout the United States and struggled to reconcile the new culture with the old." (Note: Wallach's nine: "The art historians Rudolf Wittkower, Richard Krautheimer, Charles de Tolnay, Ernst H. Gombrich, Walter Friedlaender, Alfred Neumeyer, Horst W. Janson, William Heckscher, and Max Raphael".)

Three festschrifts were given to Heckscher by his colleagues to celebrate his life's work. The first was given in 1941 by members of his prison school at the internment camp in Quebec. The second was presented in 1964 for his sixtieth birthday, when colleagues and students at the University of Utrecht dedicated a volume of the Nederlands Kuntshistorisch Jaarboek to him. He received a third festschrift in 1990 for his eighty-fifth birthday, in the form of a volume titled The Verbal & the Visual: Essays in Honor of William Sebastian Heckscher.

Heckscher held fellowships from the Institute for Advanced Study (1936–1937, 1946–1947, 1951–1953, 1960–1961), the Folger Shakespeare Library (1961, 1963), the University of Pittsburgh (Mellon Professorship, 1963–1964), the National Gallery of Art (Kress Professorship, 1979–1980), the Collège de France (1981), and the Herzog August Library (1981). Heckscher was a Benjamin Franklin Fellow of the Royal Society of Arts, London.

In 2001, the archive of Heckscher was shipped from Princeton to the Warburg Haus, Hamburg.

=== Cited works ===
- Sears, Elizabeth. "The Life and Work of William S. Heckscher." Zeitschrift für Kunstgeschichte, 53. Bd., H. 1 (1990), p. 107–133. JSTOR 1482507
- Sorenson, Lee. "Heckscher, William S." in Dictionary of Art Historians Online. Retrieved 30 September 2013.
