= Gertrude Coor =

German-American art historian

Gertrude Marianne Achenbach Coor (1915–1962) was a German-American art historian.

== Life ==
Gertrude Achenbach grew up in Frankfurt. In 1933, she moved to Italy, then Wales, and then the United States. She worked on the Princeton Index of Christian Art, and taught at Princeton University. She was research assistant to the art historian Millard Meiss.

Gertrude Coor wrote on artists including Coppo di Marcovaldo and Ugolino di Nerio. In 1961 she published a monograph on Neroccio di Bartolomeo de' Landi.

Her photographic research collection is located in the Department of Image Collections, National Gallery of Art.

== Works ==
- 'An Early Italian Tabernacle in the Possession of the Earl of Crawford and Balcarres', Gazette des Beaux-Arts, Vol. 25 (March 1944), pp. 129-152
- 'Iconography of Tobias and the Angel in Florentine Painting of the Renaissance', Marsyas, Vol. 3 (1943-1945), pp. 71-86
- 'A Visual Basis for the Documents Relating to Coppo di Marcovaldo and his Son Salerno', Art Bulletin, Vol. 28, No. 4 (1946)
- 'A rare representative of informal Dugento painting', Art Quarterly, Vol. 10 (1947), pp. 278-282
- 'Coppo di Marcovaldo: his Art in Relation to the Art of his Time', Marsyas, Vol. 5 (1947-1949), pp. 1-21
- 'A rare representative of informal Dugento painting', Gazette des beaux-arts (1953), pp. 247-258
- 'Contributions to the Study of Ugolino di Nerio's Art', Art Bulletin, Vol. 37 (September 1955), pp. 153-65
- 'Painting of St. Lucy in the Walters Art Gallery and Some Closely Related Representations', The Journal of the Walters Art Gallery, Vol. 18 (1955), pp. 78-90
- 'Earliest Italian Representation of the Coronation of the Virgin', Burlington Magazine, Vol. 99 (October 1957), pp. 328-32
- Quattrocento-Gemälde aus der Sammlung Ramboux, 1959
- Neroccio de' Landi, 1447-1500. Princeton, NJ: Princeton University Press, 1961
- 'Notes on Six Parts of Two Dismembered Sienese Altarpieces', Gazette des Beaux-Arts, Vol. 65 (March 1965), pp. 129-36
