= Richard Offner =

Historian of Florentine renaissance painting and New York University professor

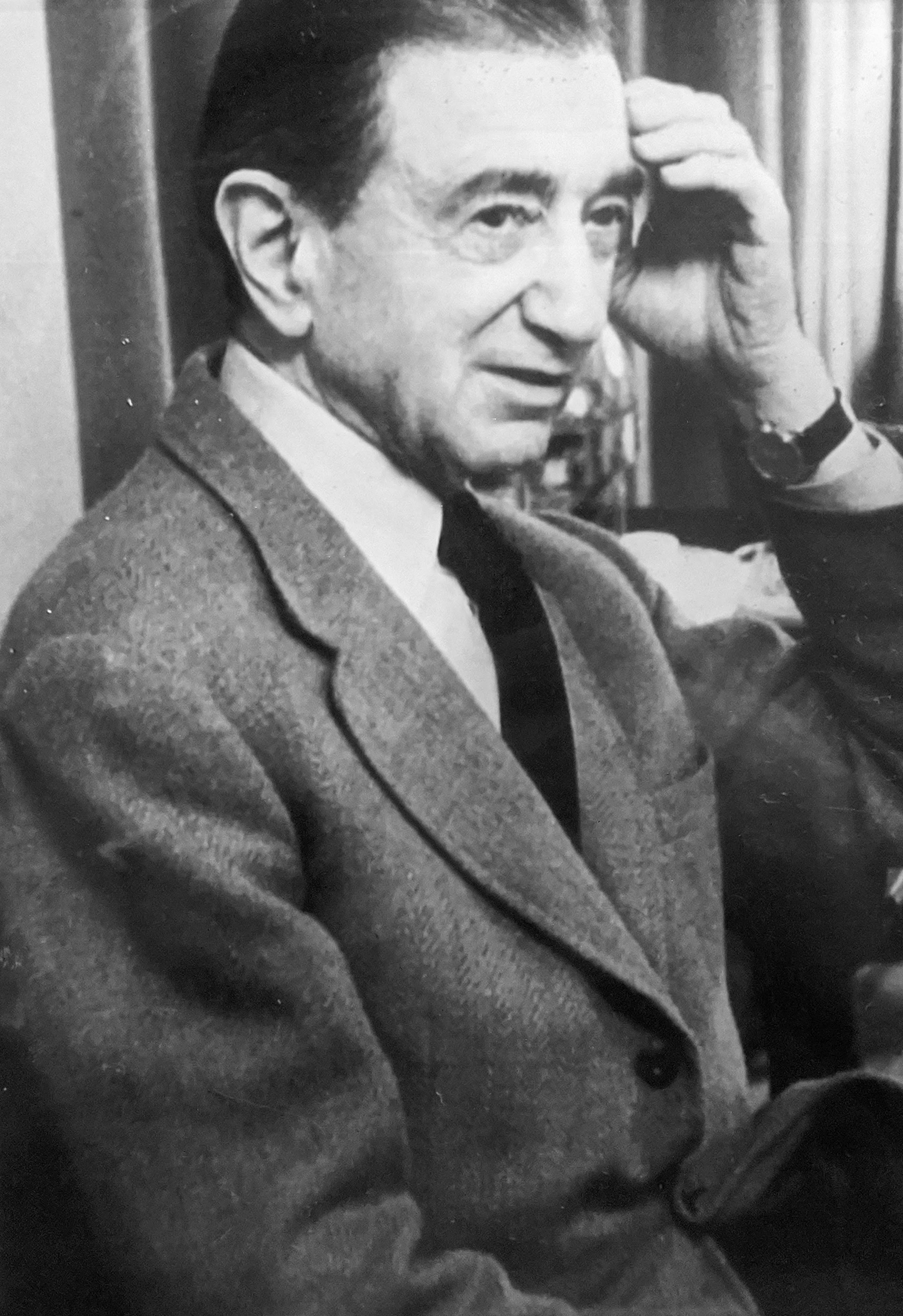
- Professor Richard Offner, c. 1960
- Born: June 30, 1889; Vienna, Austria
- Died: August 26, 1965 (aged 76); Florence, Italy
- Spouse: Phillipa Offner
- Children: Paul Offner; Antonia Offner
- Awards: Guggenheim Fellowship, 1956

Academic background
- Education: Harvard University; University of Vienna
- Doctoral advisor: Max Dvořák

Academic work
- Discipline: Art historian
- Sub-discipline: Italian painting of the Middle-Ages and Renaissance
- Institutions: University of Chicago; Harvard University; New York University
- Notable works: Critical and Historical Corpus of Florentine Painting

Richard Offner (June 30, 1889 – August 26, 1965) was an Austrian-American art historian dedicated to the study of Florentine paintings from the Renaissance.

== Biography ==
Offner was born in Vienna, Austria, on June 30, 1889. In 1891, his family emigrated to New York City. He pursued his undergraduate degree at Harvard University from 1909 to 1912, continuing as a Fellow at the American Academy in Rome from 1912 to 1914. In 1914, he submitted his dissertation in art history under Max Dvořák at the University of Vienna. He was granted his Doctorate, however, his dissertation is now lost.

In 1915, Offner accepted a position as an instructor of art history at the University of Chicago. In 1920, he moved to Harvard as a Sachs Fellow. Offner then joined New York University as an assistant professor in 1923, advancing to full professorship in 1927. He remained at NYU for the remainder of his career, serving as head of the fine arts department from 1930 to 1933, and as an emeritus from 1954 until his retirement in 1961.

Offner died in Florence, Italy on August 26, 1965, aged 76. He was survived by his screenwriter brother Mortimer (who died the following month); his son Paul (a Wisconsin State Senator), and his daughter, Antonia.

== Works ==
Offner published 12 volumes of his Critical and Historical Corpus of Florentine Painting through the Institute of Fine Arts at New York University. He was assisted by art historian Klara Steinweg, from 1930 until 1965.

Offner's photographic archive is now housed in the Department of Image Collections, National Gallery of Art. It was donated to the Gallery by the Institute of Fine Arts, New York, along with other scholars' collections, including: Gertrude Coor, James Stubblebine, Rudolf Meyer Riefstahl, Martin Weinberger and Henry Russell Hitchcock. The Offner Archive contains 50,000 photos, clippings, negatives, research and lecture notes. His attributions and organizational system have been preserved.
