= Frederick Coleridge =

English cricketer and clergyman (1826–1906)

Personal information
- Full name: Frederick John Coleridge
- Born: 4 December 1826; Ottery St Mary, Devon, England
- Died: 20 January 1906 (aged 79); Cadbury, Devon, England
- Batting: Unknown
- Relatives: Arthur Coleridge (brother); Charles Coleridge (cousin)

Domestic team information
- Years: Team
- 1847–1850: Oxford University

Career statistics
Competition	First-class
Matches	2
Runs scored	43
Batting average	10.75
100s/50s	0/0
Top score	22
Catches/stumpings	2/–
- Source: Cricinfo, 6 February 2020

Frederick John Coleridge (4 December 1826 – 20 January 1906) was an English first-class cricketer and clergyman.

The son of Francis Coleridge, he was born at Ottery St Mary in December 1826. He was educated at Eton College, before going up to Balliol College, Oxford. While studying at Oxford, Coleridge made two appearances in first-class cricket for Oxford University, appearing against Cambridge University in The University Matches of 1847 and 1850. He scored 43 runs in his two matches, with a high score of 22. After graduating from Oxford, he took holy orders in the Church of England and was the vicar of Cadbury, Devon from 1855, before becoming the rural dean in 1874. Coleridge died suddenly at Cadbury in January 1906, having been vicar there for over fifty years. His brother, Arthur, also played first-class cricket, as did his cousin Charles Coleridge. He was the great-nephew of the poet Samuel Taylor Coleridge.
