= Pixie =

Mythical creature of British folklore

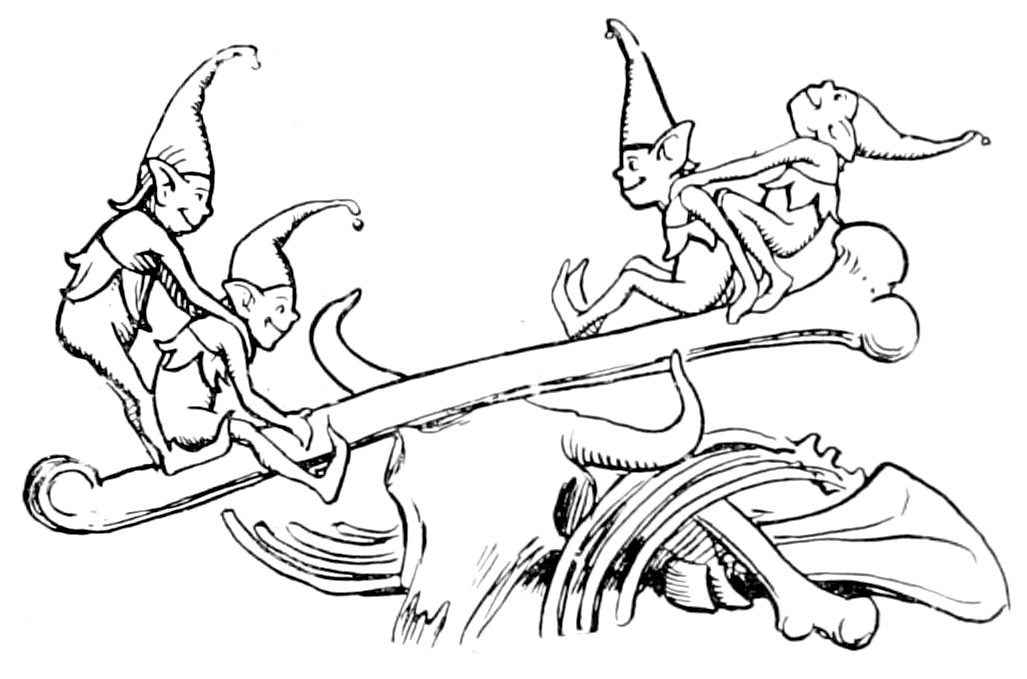
- Pixies playing on the skeleton of a cow

Creature information
- Grouping: Legendary creature Fairy; Sprite

Origin
- Country: United Kingdom
- Region: Cornwall and Devon

A pixie (also called pisky, pixy, pixi, pizkie, piskie, or pigsie in parts of Cornwall and Devon) is a mythical creature of British folklore. Pixies are speculated to be particularly concentrated in the high moorland areas around Cornwall and Devon, suggesting some Celtic origin for the belief and name. However, the word 'pixie' (under various forms) also appears in Dorset, Somerset and to a lesser extent in Sussex, Wiltshire and Hampshire.

Similar to the Irish and Scottish Aos Sí (also spelled Aos Sidhe), pixies are believed to inhabit ancient underground sites such as stone circles, barrows, dolmens, ringforts, or menhirs. In traditional regional lore, pixies are generally benign, mischievous, short of stature, and childlike; they are fond of dancing and wrestling outdoors, which they perform through the night.

In the modern era, they are usually depicted with pointed ears, often wearing a green outfit and pointed hat. Traditional stories describe them as wearing dirty, ragged bundles of rags, which they discard for gifts containing new clothes. In other depictions, their eyes are described as being pointed upwards at the outer end. These, however, are Victorian era conventions and not part of the older mythology.

== Etymology and origin ==
The origin of the word pixie is uncertain. It could have come from the Swedish dialectal pyske, meaning 'small fairy'. Others have disputed this, given there is no plausible case for Nordic dialectal records in southwest Britain, claiming instead—in view of the Cornish origin of the piskie—that the term is more Celtic in origin, though no clear ancestor of the word is known. The term Pobel Vean (Little People) is often used to refer to them collectively. Because of its location of origin, it is possible it comes from the Proto-Brythonic *bɨx, which has become bych, little, in Middle Welsh and bihan, in Breton. The change from b to p can be easily explained by a sandhi that occurs after the use of the old article or a pronoun.

Very similar analogues exist in closely related Irish (Aos Sí), Manx (Mooinjer veggey), Welsh Tylwyth Teg ('Fair Family'), and Breton (korrigan) culture. Although their common names are unrelated, there is a high degree of local variation of names. In west Penwith, the area of late survival of the Cornish language, spriggans are distinguished from pixies by their malevolent nature, while knockers are distinct for their association with tin mining in Cornwall.

Pixie mythology is believed to pre-date Christian presence in Britain. Romano-British Hooded Spirits genii cucullati are a possible ancient Celtic forebear—such dwarfish sprites wore traditional hooded cloaks associated with the British and concealed phallic daggers. In the Christian era, they were sometimes said to be the souls of children who had died unbaptised (similar to the belief in Limbo). These children would change their appearance to pixies once their clothing was placed in clay funeral pots used in their earthly lives as toys. A common idea in the Victorian era was that pixies were a folk memory of the Pictish people, but that has largely been disproven and is viewed in academia as Norse propaganda against the Picts This suggestion is still referenced in contemporary writing, but there is no proven connection, and the etymological basis is considered ambiguous. Some 19th-century researchers made more general claims about pixie origins, or have connected them with the Puck (Cornish Bucca), a mythological creature sometimes described as a fairy; the name Puck (Irish: Púca, Welsh: Pwca) is also of uncertain origin.

The earliest published version of The Three Little Pigs story is from Dartmoor in 1853 and has three little pixies in place of the pigs. In older Westcountry dialect, Standard Southern British letter pairs are sometimes transposed from the older Saxon spelling (waps for wasp, aks for ask, etc.) resulting in piskies in place of piksies (pixies) as commonly found in Devon and Cornwall in modern times.

Until the advent of contemporary fiction, pixie mythology was mostly localised to Britain. Some have noted similarities to "northern fairies", Germanic and Scandinavian elves, or Nordic Tomte, but pixies are distinguished from them by the myths and stories of Devon and Cornwall.

=== Cornwall, Devon and Somerset ===
Before the mid-19th century, the counties of Cornwall and Devon had numerous cultural depictions of pixies and fairies. Books devoted to the homely beliefs of the peasantry were filled with incidents of pixie manifestations. Some locales were named for the pixies associated with them. In Devon, near Challacombe, a group of rocks were named after the pixies said to dwell there. At Trevose Head in Cornwall, 600 pixies were said to have gathered dancing and laughing in a circle that had appeared upon the turf until one of them, named Omfra, lost his laugh. After searching amongst the barrows of the ancient kings of Cornwall on St Breock Downs, he wades through the bottomless Dozmary Pool on Bodmin Moor until his laugh is restored by King Arthur in the form of a Chough.

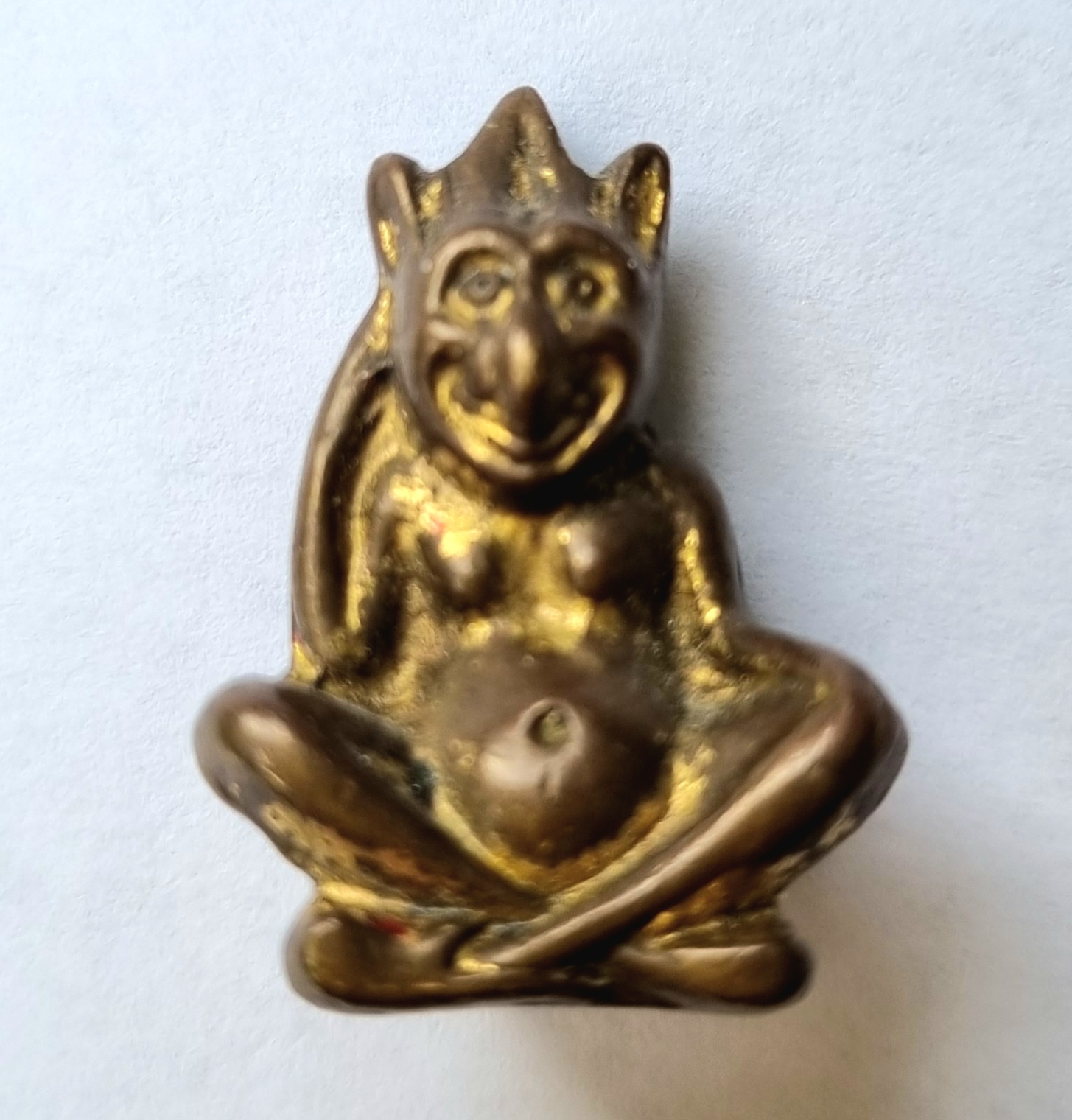
Dartmoor Pisky

In the legends associated with Dartmoor, pixies (or piskeys) are said to disguise themselves as a bundle of rags to lure children. The pixies of Dartmoor are fond of music, dancing, and riding on Dartmoor colts. These pixies are generally said to be helpful for humans, sometimes helping needy widows and others with housework. They are not completely benign, however, as they have a reputation for misleading travellers known as being "pixy-led", and it can be cured by turning a coat inside-out.

In some of the legends and historical accounts, they are presented as having an anthropomorphic stature. For instance, a member of the Elford family in Tavistock, Devon, successfully hid from Cromwell's troops in a pixie house. Though the entrance has narrowed with time, the pixie house, a natural cavern on Sheep Tor, is still accessible.

At Buckland St. Mary, Somerset, pixies and fairies are said to have been in a war. The pixies were victorious and visit occasionally, whilst the fairies are said to have left after their loss.

By the early 19th century, their contact with humans had diminished. In Samuel Drew's 1824 book Cornwall, Drew states: "The age of pixies, like that of chivalry, is gone. There is, perhaps, at present hardly a house they are reputed to visit. Even the fields and lanes which they formerly frequented seem to be nearly forsaken. Their music is rarely heard."

==== Pixie Day ====
Pixie Day is an old tradition which takes place annually in June at the East Devon town of Ottery St. Mary. The day commemorates a legend of pixies being banished from the town to local caves known as the "Pixie's Parlour".

The Pixie Day legend originates from the early days of Christianity, when a local bishop decided to build a church in Otteri (Ottery St. Mary) and commissioned a set of bells, or bell ringers, to come from Wales, who were escorted by monks on their journey.

The pixies were worried, as they knew that once the bells were installed it would be the death knell of their rule over the land. They cast a spell over the monks to redirect them from the road to Otteri to the road leading them to the cliff's edge at Sidmouth. Just as the monks were about to fall over the cliff, one of the monks stubbed his toe on a rock and said "God bless my soul", breaking the spell.

The bells were then brought to Otteri and installed. However, the pixies' spell was not completely broken; each year on a day in June, the "pixies" come out and capture the town's bell ringers, later imprisoning them in Pixies' Parlour to be rescued by the Vicar of Ottery St. Mary. This legend is reenacted each year by the Cub and Brownie groups of Ottery St. Mary, with a specially-constructed Pixies' Parlour in the Town Square. The original Pixie's Parlour can be found along the banks of the River Otter.

== Characteristics ==
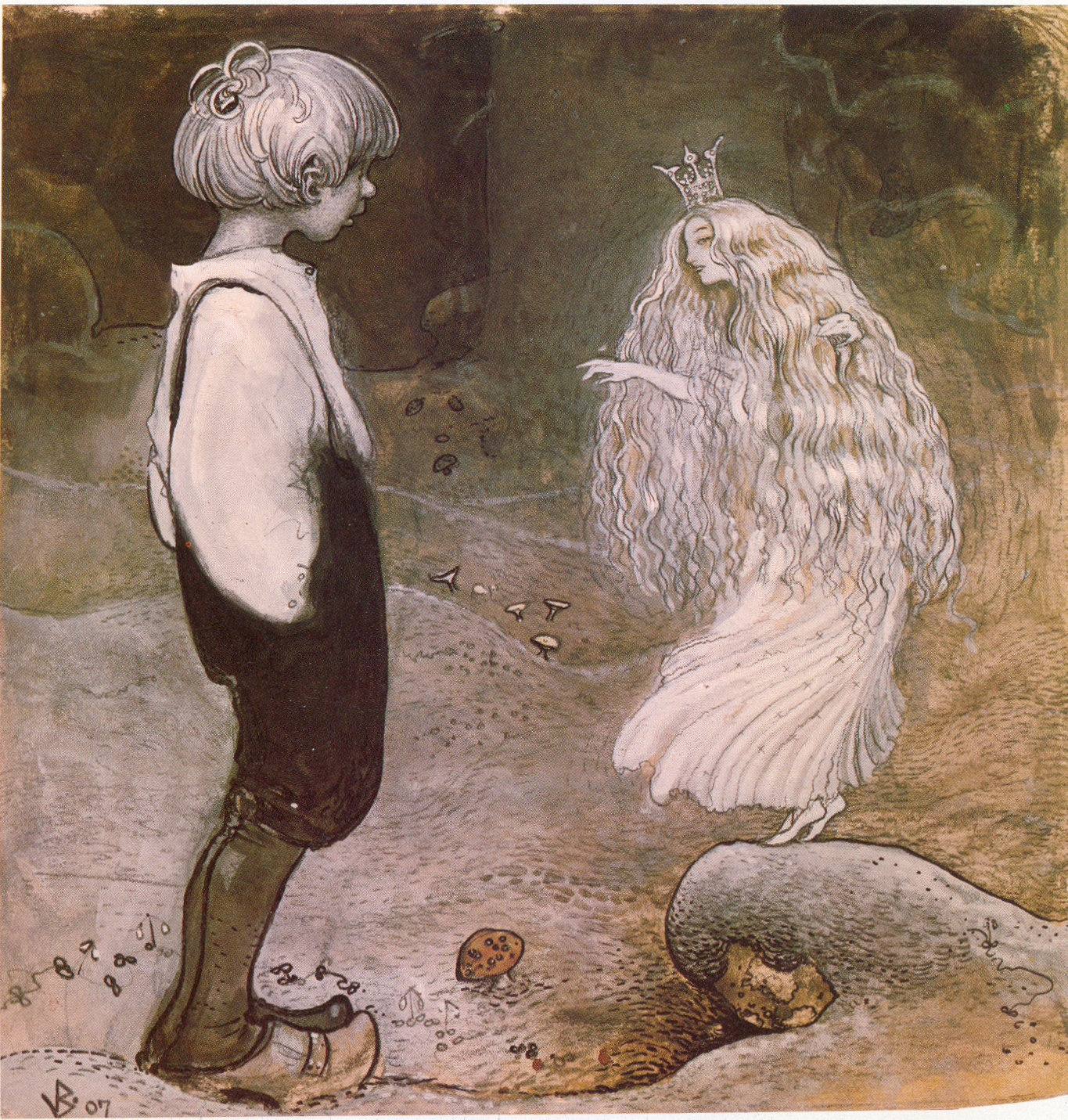
John Bauer's illustration of Alfred Smedberg's "The Seven Wishes" in Among Pixies and Trolls, an anthology of children's stories

Pixies are described in folklore and fiction in various ways, most commonly as ill-clothed or naked. In 1890, William Crossing noted a pixie's preference for bits of finery: "Indeed, a sort of weakness for finery exists among them, and a piece of ribbon appears to be... highly prized by them."

Some pixies are said to steal children or lead travellers astray. This seems to be a blend from fairy mythology not originally attached to pixies; in 1850, Thomas Keightley noted that much of Devon pixie mythology may have originated from fairy myth. Pixies are said to reward consideration and punish neglect on the part of larger humans, for which Keightley gives examples. By their presence, they bring blessings to those who are fond of them.

Pixies are said to have a spiritual connection to horses, riding them for pleasure and making tangled ringlets in the manes of those horses.

In mythology, pixies are sometimes said to be of human origin or to "partake of human nature", as distinct from fairies, whose mythology is traced to immaterial and malignant spirit forces. In some discussions, pixies are presented as wingless, pygmy-like creatures. However, this is probably a later accretion to the mythology.

One British scholar stated his belief that "Pixies were evidently a smaller race, and, from the greater obscurity of the ... tales about them, I believe them to have been an earlier race."

=== Literary interpretations ===
Many Victorian-era poets saw pixies as magical beings. An example is Samuel Minturn Peck. In his poem, "The Pixies", he writes:

'Tis said their forms are tiny, yet

All human ills they can subdue,

Or with a wand or amulet

Can win a maiden’s heart for you;

And many a blessing know to stew

To make to wedlock bright;

Give honour to the dainty crew,

The Pixies are abroad tonight.

The late 19th-century English poet Nora Chesson summarised pixie mythology in a poem entitled "The Pixies". She gathered all the speculations and myths into verse:

Have e’er you seen the Pixies, the fold not blest or banned?

They walk upon the waters; they sail upon the land,

They make the green grass greener where’er their footsteps fall,

The wildest hind in the forest comes at their call.

They steal from bolted linneys, they milk the key at grass,

The maids are kissed a-milking, and no one hears them pass.

They flit from byre to stable and ride unbroken foals,

They seek out human lovers to win them souls.

The Pixies know no sorrow, the Pixies feel no fear,

They take no care for harvest or seedtime of the year;

Age lays no finger on them, the reaper time goes by

The Pixies, they who change not, nor grow old or die.

The Pixies though they love us, behold us pass away,

And are not sad for flowers they gathered yesterday,

To-day has crimson foxglove.

If purple hose-in-hose withered last night

To-morrow will have its rose.

Pixies are "in-between", not cursed by God nor especially blessed. They do the unexpected, they bless the land, and are forest creatures whom other wild creatures find alluring and non-threatening. They love humans, taking some for mates, and are nearly ageless. They are winged, flitting from place to place.

The Pixie Day tradition in Samuel Taylor Coleridge's hometown of Ottery St Mary in East Devon was the inspiration for his poem "Songs of the Pixies".

The Victorian-era writer Mary Elizabeth Whitcombe divided pixies into tribes according to personality and deeds. The novelist Anna Eliza Bray suggested that pixies and fairies were distinct species.

== See also ==
- Colt pixie
- Goblin
- Jinn
- Leprechaun
- Nisse
- Peter and the Piskies: Cornish Folk and Fairy Tales
- Pixie (comics)
- Puck
- Sylph
- Tinker Bell
