= Ottery St Mary astronomical clock =

14th-century astronomical clock in Ottery St Mary, England

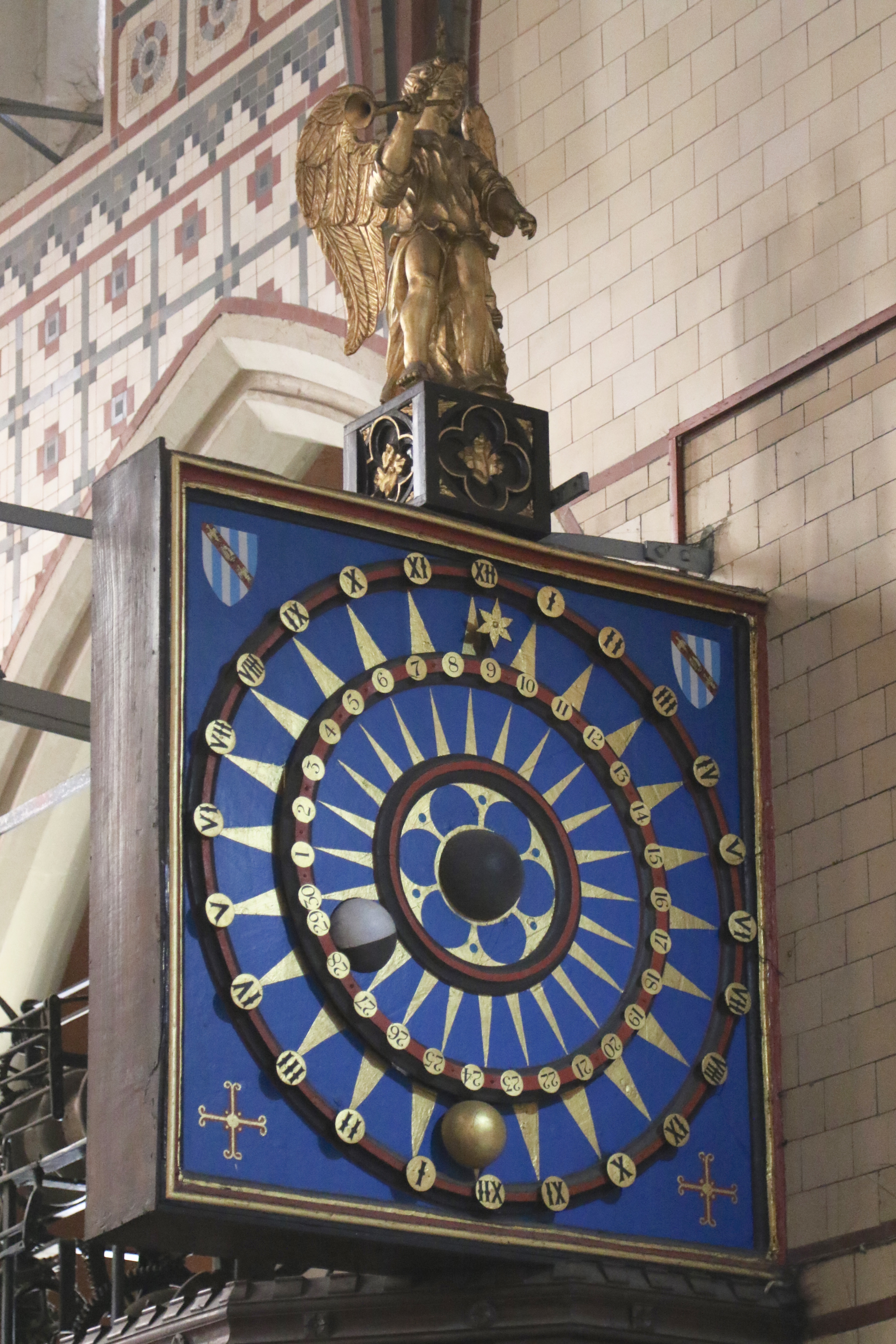
Astronomical Clock in St Mary's Church, Ottery St Mary, with the Earth at centre, orbited by the black-and-white Moon and the golden Sun.

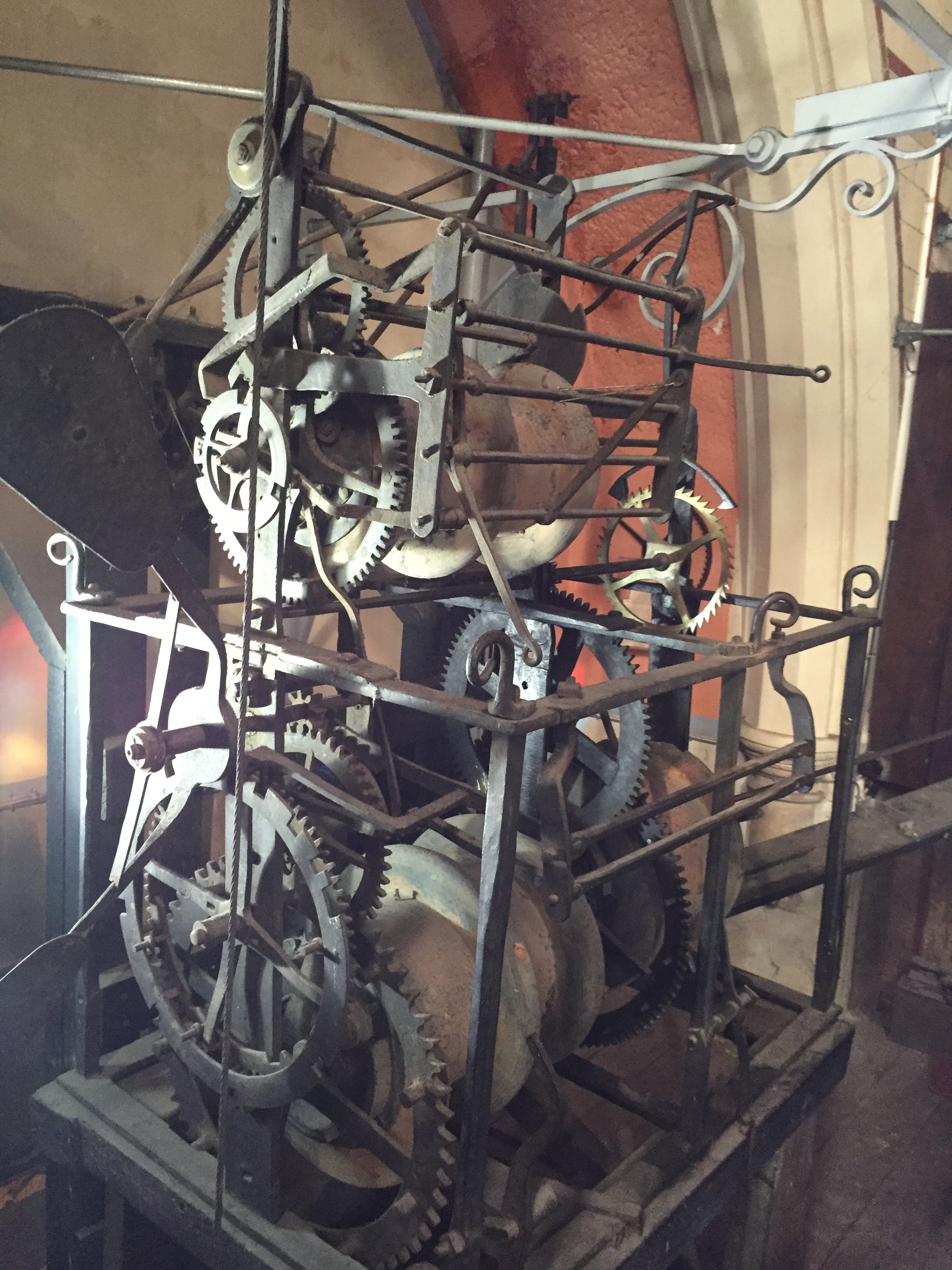
The clock movement of the Astronomical Clock

Ottery St Mary Astronomical Clock is a 14th-century astronomical clock in St Mary's Church, Ottery St Mary, in Devon in south-west England.

== History and description ==
The south transept of the church of St Mary in Ottery St Mary houses the astronomical clock, one of the oldest surviving mechanical clocks in England. It is commonly attributed to Bishop John de Grandisson, who was Bishop of Exeter (1327–1369), and adheres to Ptolemaic cosmology with the Earth at the centre of the Solar System.

At the centre of the dial, the Earth is represented by a black ball. The Sun is represented by a gold ball which rotates round the outermost ring of the dial, showing the time. The Moon is represented by a ball which is half white and half black, which turns on its axis to show the phases of the moon. This ball rotates around the middle ring of the dial, numbered to show the days of the lunar month. The clock is similar in its display to the Exeter Cathedral astronomical clock in Devon and the Wimborne Minster astronomical clock in Dorset.

After 30 years of silence, the Ottery St Mary clock was restored to working condition in 1907 by John James Hall FRAS of Exeter. The rededication service, on 20 May 1907, was attended by the Bishop of Exeter, Archibald Robertson, who formally set the clock going.
