= Peter Garwood =

English schoolteacher and Inspector of Schools (1931–2020)

Peter Hugh William Garwood (29 May 1931 – 19 April 2020) was an English schoolmaster and inspector for HM Inspectorate of Schools (now Ofsted) in the West Midlands, Devon and Cornwall, and the Channel Islands.

== Early life ==
Born in Finchley, Garwood was the son of William Garwood, an accountant, and his wife, Kate Manders, and was an only child.

During the Second World War, he was evacuated to Oxfordshire, before rejoining his parents when they moved to Rabley Heath, Welwyn, Hertfordshire. From 1944 he was educated at Haileybury and Imperial Service College in that county.

For his National Service, Garwood trained at the Mons Officer Cadet School and on 21 October 1950 was commissioned as a Second Lieutenant into the 4th Battalion, the King's African Rifles. He was posted to Nanyuki, where in his troop was a young corporal, Idi Amin, whom he remembered as a good soldier but a violent young man.

In October 1951, on his return to England, Garwood joined New College, Oxford, to read history, graduating in 1954. While at Oxford, he was an officer of the 3rd (Oxford University) Volunteer Battalion of the Oxfordshire and Buckinghamshire Light Infantry, with the rank of acting Lieutenant from June 1952. In May 1954, Garwood was promoted to Lieutenant.

== Career ==
After Oxford, Garwood joined the Colonial Development Corporation as a trainee. In 1957 he changed his career path when he took a position as a teacher of history at King's School, Canterbury. In 1959, he became a housemaster at the school and stayed there until 1966, when he left as a result of his marriage breaking down. While teaching at Canterbury, he was commissioned as a Second Lieutenant into the Combined Cadet Force and was also a member of the Reserve of Officers of the 1st Green Jackets. In May 1961, he was promoted to Lieutenant. He resigned his commission on 21 May 1966.

On leaving Canterbury, Garwood got a new job teaching history at King George V Grammar School, Southport, Merseyside. In 1970, he became head of history there. In 1974, he was appointed as head of the Social Studies Department at Banbury Sixth Form College, a comprehensive in Oxfordshire.

In 1977, Garwood joined Her Majesty's Inspectorate of Schools, and until he retired in 1990 was Schools Inspector for the West Midlands, Cornwall, Devon, and the Channel Islands, reported to be "forthright in his judgments". An obituary in The Guardian noted that he had a "natural air of authority which disguised strongly leftwing views that could catch public school heads unawares if they were foolish enough to think that he was 'one of us'."

== Personal life ==
Garwood met Dorothy Roberts in the Colonial Development Corporation, and they were married in 1957. In 1965, he began an affair with Daphne Wenley who at the time was the wife of a fellow teacher and had four young children. Their marriages both ended in divorce, and Garwood and Wenley were married in 1968. They had two more children together, a son born in Southport in 1967 and a daughter born in 1969.

In 1990, the Garwoods retired to West Hill, near Ottery St Mary, Devon, where they lived for thirty years, sharing interests in gardening, books, and family, and setting out to create a "garden paradise". In April 2020, soon after they had moved to Oxfordshire to be closer to grandchildren, of whom they had fifteen, Garwood died, aged 88. He was survived by his wife and children.
