= St Mary's Church, Ottery St Mary =

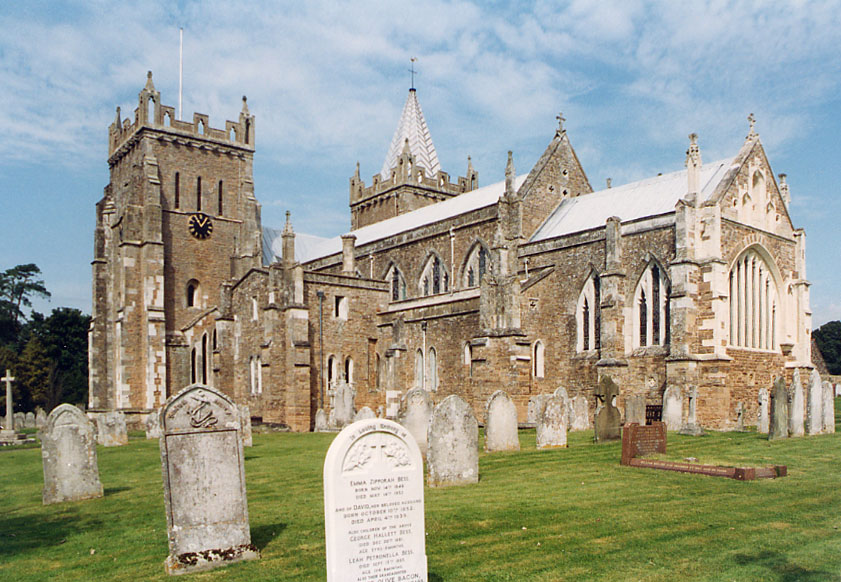
- St Mary's Church from the south east
- St Mary's Church, Ottery St Mary
- 50°45′11.04″N 3°16′44.03″W
- OS grid reference: SY 09852 95580
- Location: Ottery St Mary, Devon
- Country: England
- Denomination: Church of England
- Churchmanship: Broad Church
- Website: ottervalechurches.org

History
- Dedication: St Mary the Virgin
- Consecrated: 1260

Architecture
- Heritage designation: Grade I listed

Specifications
- Length: 163 feet (50 m)
- Height: 71 feet (22 m)

Administration
- Province: Province of Canterbury
- Diocese: Diocese of Exeter
- Archdeaconry: Exeter
- Deanery: Ottery
- Parish: Ottery St Mary

Clergy
- Rector: Revd Lydia Cook

St Mary's Church is a Grade I listed building, a parish church in the Church of England in Ottery St Mary, Devon.

The church is part of "Churches Together in Ottery St Mary" which includes the churches of four other denominations in the town.

== History ==
The parish church of St Mary's has been referred to as "a miniature Exeter Cathedral". Like the cathedral it is cruciform in plan, with transepts formed by towers

Nikolaus Pevsner describes the building as "lying large and low like a tired beast". It is 163 feet (50 m) long, and the towers are 71 feet (22 m) high. It was consecrated in 1260, at which time the manor and patronage of the church belonged to Rouen Cathedral, as it had from before the Norman invasion. Pevsner assumes that the tower-transepts and the outer walls of the chancel date back to 1260, and that the towers were built in imitation of those at Exeter.

This Grade I listed building is one of 107 Listed sites in the area. The summary for the Listing provides this information: "Consecrated by Bishop Bronescombe in 1260. Altered and added to by Bishop Grandison circa 1330. Mainly Early English ... 2 towers above transepts .... The interior was restored drastically mid C19 by Butterfield and others". The work in the 1300s included "rebuilding of the nave, and addition of the Lady Chapel at the east end and two chantry chapels either side of the chancel" according to a reliable source. Other renovations were completed circa 1520: "principally expansion of the north nave aisle, complete with elaborate, fan-vaulted ceiling and pendant bosses".

=== St Mary's College ===
In 1335 John Grandisson, Bishop of Exeter, bought the manor and advowson from Rouen and on 22 January 1338 established a collegiate foundation with forty members. He rebuilt much of the church, and the present nave, chancel, aisles and Lady chapel date from this time. The nave is of five bays, and the chancel, unusually long in proportion, is of six, with vestry chapels to north and south.

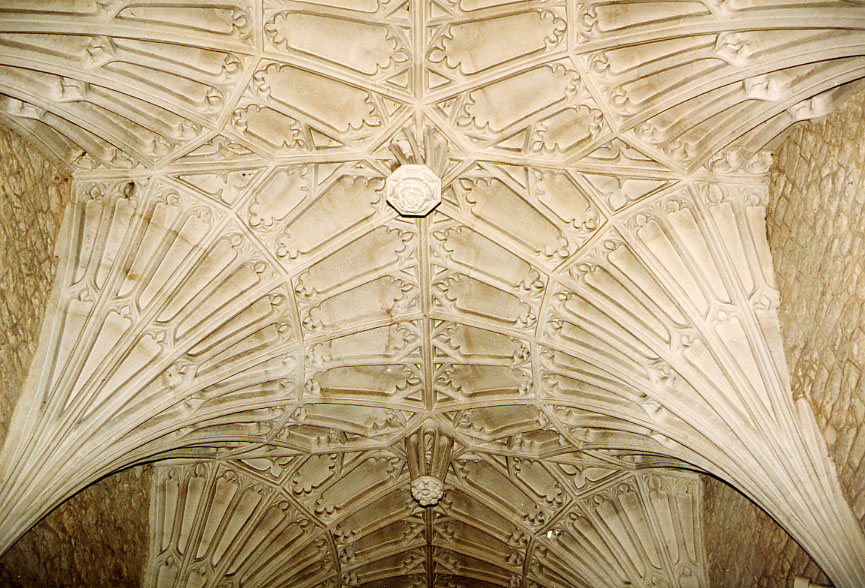
The roof

The church is noted for its painted roof and early sixteenth-century fan vaulted aisle, the Dorset Aisle, designed and commissioned by Cecily Bonville, 7th Baroness Harington, whose first husband was Thomas Grey, 1st Marquess of Dorset. The church has ten misericords dating from the building of the church in 1350, five showing the arms of Bishop John de Grandisson. The church interior also has two medieval carved stone Green Man sculptures. Other interesting features include the tombs of Otho de Grandisson and his wife, the altar screen, sedilia, and a wooden eagle given by Bishop Grandisson.

The college was dissolved on 24 December 1545 and this church began serving the parish, under the management of governors. The other buildings of the college were demolished.

=== Parish church ===
The building was closed on 21 May 1849 for a full restoration by the architect William Butterfield. His alterations included lowering the floor level of the transepts, crossing and western part of the chancel to that of the nave, making the east end, designed for the needs of the collegiate foundation, more suitable for parochial use. All of the galleries were removed, except for that in the south transept which was retained for the organ. The pews were removed and substituted with open seating. The altar area was paved with encaustic tiles. The walls were scraped of plaster and cleaned. The church reopened on 22 May 1850. The restoration was achieved by voluntary donation, including one of £1,200 from Mr. Justice Coleridge.

New choir stalls were dedicated in 1908. They were designed by John Duke Coleridge and paid for by Miss Mary Dickinson in memory of her father, the late Rev. Frederick Binley Dickinson.

The ancient altar screen had three vacant niches filled with sculptured scenes in 1934. The sculptural work was done in Beer stone, by Herbert Read, sculptor of Exeter, funded by Mrs Winstanley in memory of her husband, Harold Winstanley.

There is a small stone plaque commemorating the poet Samuel Taylor Coleridge in the south churchyard wall. Ottery St Mary parish registers are held in the Devon Record Office and begin in 1601.

Sir Ernest Mason Satow, scholar, diplomat and Japanologist, is buried in the churchyard, and a plaque inside the church, originally at the British Legation chapel in Peking, commemorates his life.

On 26 September 2015, St Mary's was the location of the first ordination service in the Church of England to be led by a woman: Sarah Mullally, Bishop of Crediton, ordained two deacons as priests.

== List of vicars ==
- 1154 William
- 1191 Peter the Clerk (resigned)
- 1191 Roger the Chaplain
- 1283 John de Wolfrington
- 1297 John de Middleton
- 1310 Gulfridus
- 1310 John de Thormerton
- 1335 Oliver de Fayrsy

=== Wardens of St Mary's college ===
- 1338 Richard de Gonisale
- 1349 Henry Bonet
- 1350 Andrew Attemore
- 1379 John Coterell
- 1397 William Slade
- 1399 John Bokeland
- 1412 John Tyrel
- 1415 John Sarger
- 1446 John Hancock
- 1490 Thomas Cornyssh
- 1511 Thomas Mitchell
- 1513 Thomas Chard
- 1518 Walter Dudman
- 1525 Oliver Smythe
- 1544 John Fyssher

=== Vicars of the parish church ===
- 1550 John Bagster
- 1580 Ralph Manwayringe
- 1590 Nicholas Forward
- 1626 John Forward
- 1661 Melchisedeck Alford
- 1696 Thomas Gatchell
- 1713 Hugh Lewes
- ???? Richard Jenkinson
- 1722 Ralph Farthing
- 1744 Richard Holme
- 1760 John Coleridge
- 1781 Fulwood Smerdon
- 1794 George Smith
- 1841 Sidney William Cornish
- 1874 William Henry Metcalfe
- 1890 Maitland Kelly
- 1900 William Emmanuel Pryke
- 1908 John William Metcalfe
- 1920 Leonard Bristow Stallard
- 1938 Bernard Cecil Jackson
- 1950 David Rufus Price
- 1978 Peter John McGee
- 1996 Simon George Franklin

== Astronomical clock ==
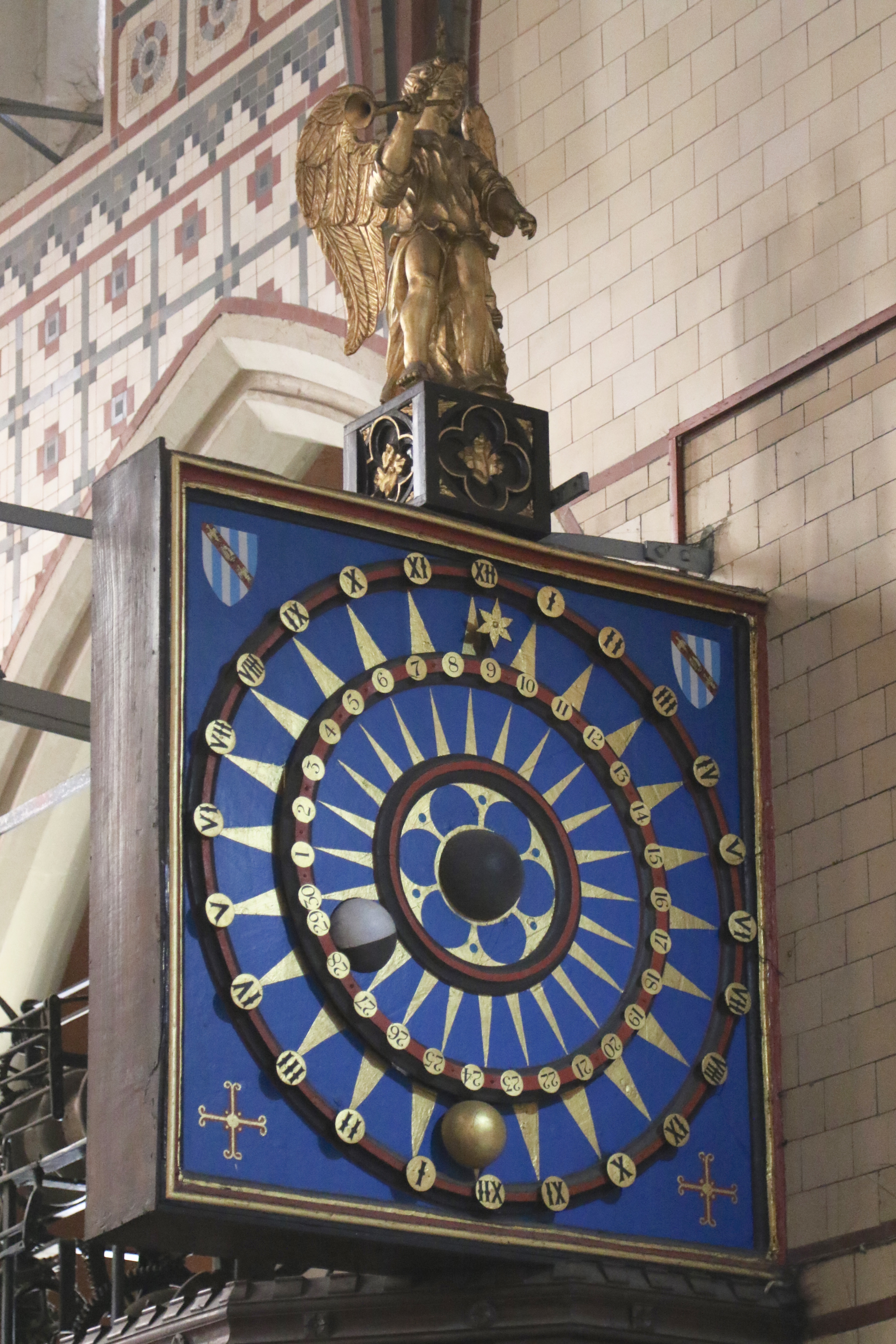
The astronomical clock

The south transept (bell tower) houses the Ottery St Mary astronomical clock, one of the oldest surviving mechanical clocks in the country. It is commonly attributed to Bishop John de Grandisson, who was Bishop of Exeter (1327–69) and adheres to Ptolemaic cosmology with the Earth at the centre of the Solar System.

The clock was restored to working condition in 1907.

== Organ ==
The church has had organs since at least the 14th century, as they are mentioned in Bishop Grandisson's statues for the foundation of the collegiate church. By the time the college was dissolved in 1545, there were three organs, but whatever organs survived into the 17th century were destroyed in 1645 during the English Civil War.

Around 1828, Flight and Robson provided a new organ in the west gallery. This was moved to the south tower in 1849. Hele & Co carried out work in 1878 and again in 1901. After further work in 1934, Eustace and Alldridge from Exeter enlarged the organ by incorporating pipework by Willis and William Hill, and the organ was rebuilt again in 1990 by Michael Farley. A specification of the organ can be found on the National Pipe Organ Register.

== Parish status ==
The church is in a joint parish with:

- St John the Baptist's Church, Colaton Raleigh
- St James and St Anne's Church, Alfington
- St Gregory the Great's Church, Harpford
- St Luke's Church, Newton Poppleford
- St Edward the Confessor's Church, Wiggaton
- St Gregory's Church, Venn Ottery
- St Michael the Archangel's Church, West Hill
