= St Edward's Church, Wiggaton =

Church in Devon, England

St Edward's Church
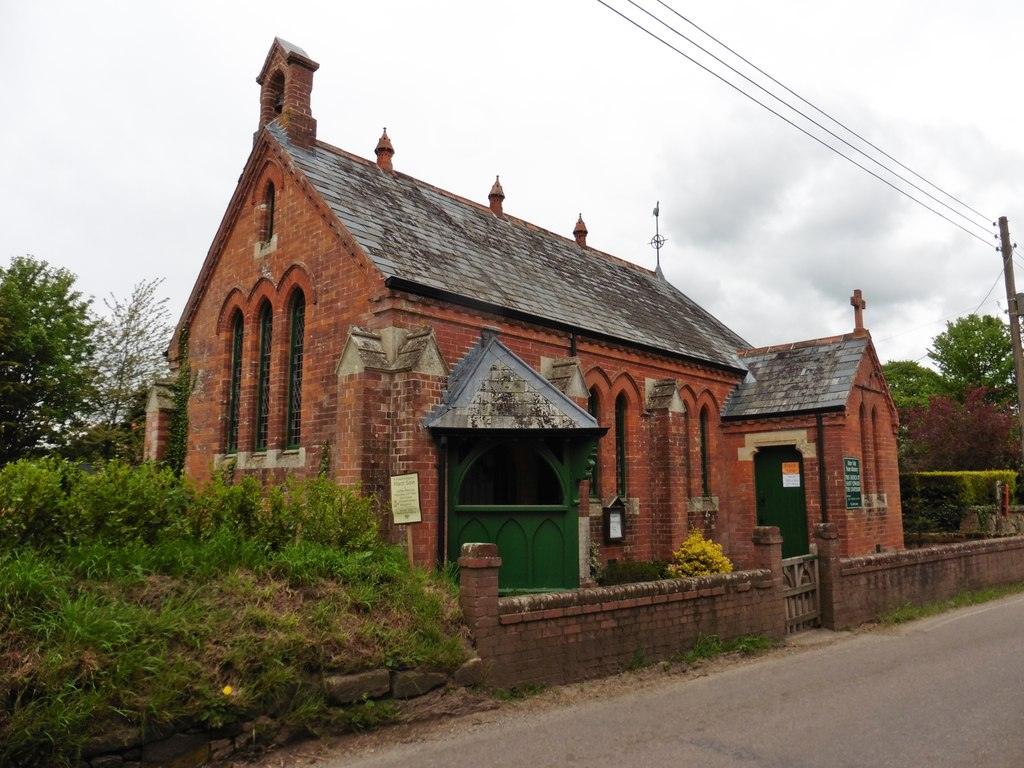

Religion
- Affiliation: Church of England
- Ecclesiastical or organizational status: Active

Location
- Location: Wiggaton, Devon, England
- Interactive map of St Edward's Church
- Coordinates: 50.7355°N 3.2759°W

Architecture
- Architect: Edward G. Warren
- Type: Church
- Completed: 1893

St Edward's Church is a Church of England church in Wiggaton, Devon, England. It was constructed in 1892–93 and designed by the Exeter architect Edward G. Warren. The church has been Grade II listed since 1952.

== History ==
St Edward's was built as a chapel of ease to the parish church of St Mary's in Ottery St Mary. At the time, Wiggaton and its surrounding neighbourhood had a population of around 150, with most inhabitants approximately a mile from the parish church. In 1890, Rev. M. Kelly, the vicar of Ottery St Mary, began holding services once a fortnight in Wiggaton's schoolroom. Plans were then made for the erection of a church and funds began to be raised by subscription. The church was designed by Edward G. Warren of Exeter, with F. Grace of Exmouth hired as the builder.

The foundation stone was laid on 10 November 1892 by William Rennell Coleridge of Salston. The ceremony was attended by the choir of the parish church and a short service conducted by Rev. Kelly. The church, which cost £400 to build, was dedicated to Edward the Confessor by the Bishop of Exeter, the Right Rev. Edward Bickersteth, on 8 March 1893.

== Architecture ==
St Edward's is built of red brick, with dressings in Corsham Down stone and a slate roof, in the Early English style. It was designed to accommodate approximately 80 persons. The east end of the building is semi-octagonal, and the vestry and organ chamber are located on the south side. The east end has a central triple light window and the west gable has a bell-cote. The roof is open timbered.
