= Colt pixie =

Creature from English folklore

A colt pixie (also colepixie, colepixy, collepixie, collpixie, colt-pixie, colt pixy, and cold pixie) is a creature from English folklore in Southern England and South West England (especially the New Forest and Dorset). According to local mythology, it is a type of Pixie which takes the form of a scruffy, pale horse or pony to lead travellers and other livestock astray (similar to a Will-o'-the-wisp), and is often associated with Puck. Erasmus's 16th century translation Apophthegmatum opus includes the line: "I shall be ready at thine elbow to plaie the parte of Hobgoblin or Collepixie."

The phrase "as ragged as a colt pixie" was common in the New Forest at least as recently as the early 20th century. In the dialect of Dorset "to colt-pixy" meant to beat down the remaining apples after a crop has been harvested, i.e. to take the colts' horde.

== Colloquial survivals ==
- Fossil echinoids are sometimes called colt-pixies' heads
- Cold Pixie's Cave is the name of a barrow in the New Forest, near Lyndhurst
