= Arthur Coleridge =

English lawyer, musician, and cricketer

Arthur Duke Coleridge (baptised, 1 February 1830 – 29 October 1913) was a nineteenth-century English lawyer who, as an amateur musician with influential connections, was the founder of The Bach Choir and the man who introduced the Mass in B minor by Johann Sebastian Bach to the English concert repertoire. He was also a cricketer who played first-class cricket for Cambridge University in 1850. He was born at Ottery St Mary, Devon and died at South Kensington, London.

== Background and education ==
Arthur Coleridge was the son of Francis Coleridge and the great-nephew of the poet Samuel Taylor Coleridge. He was educated at Eton College where he played in the cricket team, hitting the winning runs in the 1847 Eton v Harrow match at Lord's. Matriculating at King's College, Cambridge in February 1849, Coleridge played a single first-class cricket match at Cambridge, scoring 1 and 17 when opening the batting against Marylebone Cricket Club. It is not known if he batted right- or left-handed.

== Legal career ==
Coleridge became a Fellow at King's College before becoming a lawyer, being called to the bar in 1860. He went into the administrative side of the English legal system and served as Clerk of Assize for the Midland Circuit for 37 years up to his death: he was taken ill while officiating at Lincoln Assizes and returned immediately to London just two days before his death. It was reported that he did not miss a single assizes session over his 37 years in post.

== Music ==
Coleridge was at the centre of British musical life for many years, and his home at 12, Cromwell Place, South Kensington, became a meeting place for many of the leading musicians of the day. He was himself an amateur tenor with a voice "of great power and dramatic quality" and "was one of the few amateurs who could speak with professionals" on equal terms. At Cambridge, he was a friend of Thomas Attwood Walmisley, the influential organist at Trinity College and from 1836 professor of music at Cambridge; he was later closely associated with William Sterndale Bennett, Walmisley's successor as professor of music at Cambridge and later director (and reviver) of the Royal Academy of Music.

Coleridge's singing and his friendships brought him into contact with the Royal Academy of Music piano professor Otto Goldschmidt and his wife, the Swedish soprano Jenny Lind, and it was through these connections that the idea for a London performance of J. S. Bach's Mass in B Minor was hatched: the Mass had been performed in full for the first time only in Leipzig in 1859. With backing from his friends, Coleridge organized the first performance in England, at St James's Hall on 26 April 1876. "Having worked the organization, and seen it through, he, with the modesty which was characteristic of him, left others to reap the credit," his obituarist in The Times in 1913 wrote. He was also the founder of the Bach Choir in 1865 and of the UK version of the Mendelssohn Scholarship whose first recipient was the young Arthur Sullivan.

Unlike Sterndale Bennett, whose devotion to Mendelssohn led him to reject later composers such as Schumann and Brahms, Coleridge was an enthusiastic promoter of new music and very catholic in his tastes. He knew Liszt, Rossini and the now-obscure but prolific Ferdinand Hiller personally, and promoted the works of Schumann, Brahms and Wagner. He was a friend of the Hungarian violinist Joseph Joachim. In later life, he lectured on the lives and works of the composers and performers he had known.

== Writing ==
Coleridge's involvement with German music led him into translation work: he translated the first significant biography of the composer Franz Schubert by Heinrich Kreissle von Hellborn (Vienna, 1865), and the Life of Moscheles from his diary entries by Moscheles' wife Charlotte. He also translated the Goethe play Egmont which inspired one of Beethoven's popular overtures. In the 1890s, he wrote a book of reminiscence and anecdote about his schooldays called Eton in the Forties. The music critic J A Fuller Maitland completed and edited his Reminiscences in 1921.

Coleridge's daughter Mary Coleridge was a published poet and novelist: her entry in the Dictionary of National Biography indicates that Coleridge's circle of friendship extended beyond musicians to include literary figures such as Alfred Tennyson and Robert Browning, as well as painters such as John Millais. Hubert Parry, one of Arthur's musical friends, was one of the first composers to set Mary's words to music in the seven poems that make up his English Lyrics, Ninth Set, published in 1909.
