= The King's School, Ottery St Mary =

The King's School
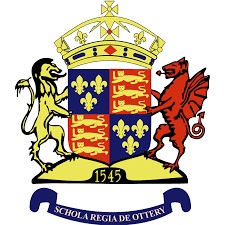

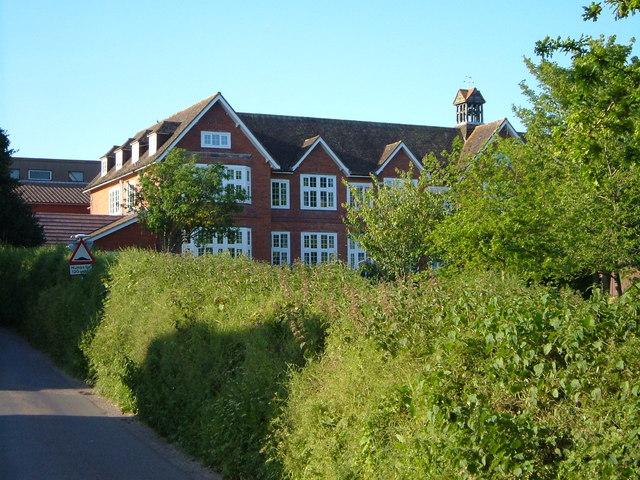

Location
- Barrack Road; Ottery St Mary, Devon, EX11 1RA; England; 50°45′01″N 3°17′34″W

Information
- Type: Academy
- Motto: Schola Regia De Ottery
- Established: 1335 and 1545
- Founders: John Grandisson (1335), Henry VIII (1545)
- Department for Education URN: 136673 Tables
- Ofsted: Reports
- Headteacher: Rob Gammon
- Staff: 100
- Gender: Mixed
- Age: 11 to 18
- Enrolment: 1100
- Houses: Coleridge; Kennaway; Patteson; Raleigh
- Website: https://www.thekings.devon.sch.uk/

The King's School is a secondary school and sixth form located in Ottery St Mary, Devon, England. It was established as a choir school by the bishop John Grandisson in 1335, but was replaced by a grammar school by Henry VIII in 1545. It became a comprehensive school in 1982, and an academy in 2011. The school's pupils are mainly drawn from its five feeder primaries in the surrounding area: Ottery St Mary primary school, West Hill Primary School, Payhembury Church of England Primary School, Feniton Church of England Primary School and Tipton St John Church of England Primary School.

The school has access to facilities shared with the public, the Colin Tooze Sports Centre. Rob Gammon became headteacher in 2016, succeeding Faith Jarrett.

== History ==
The King's School is an 11-18 secondary school with just over 1100 students and 100 staff. In 1335, Bishop John de Grandisson bought the manor of Ottery St Mary from the Dean and Chapter of Rouen who had owned it since 1061. He obtained a royal licence from Edward III to found his College of Secular Canons and established a choir school in Ottery St Mary in 1335 for eight boys and a Master of Grammar. The school did not start very promisingly in 1337 with the members of the choir-school being accused of "dissolute and insolent behaviour in the parish". Grandisson being a disciplinarian, flogging was the punishment, but this had no effect and consequently the boys were heavily fined for every day's absence from the choir. For over two hundred years the canons carried out Bishop Grandisson's instructions and the choir school boys were educated.

When the English Reformation reached the college in 1545 it was dissolved. Upon some whim or persuasion, however, Henry VIII established a free grammar school in the town – hence "The King's School" and their coat of arms became a Lion and a Dragon supporting the Tudor royal shield surmounted by a crown.

The Chanter's House is a Grade II* listed building which served as the headmaster's lodging. It dates from the 17th century, incorporating parts of the former Precentor's house, known as Heath's Court. In 1645, Oliver Cromwell held a convention in the house's dining room, and Thomas Fairfax stayed at the house from October to December in that year.

The poet Samuel Taylor Coleridge's father was headmaster of The King's School, Ottery St Mary.

== Facilities ==
The school has access to a facility shared by the public, the Colin Tooze Sports Centre. The King's School was designated as a Specialist Sports College in the summer of 2002. Facilities for PE and sport at King's were enabled by that status to be developed. In partnership with East Devon District Council, a purpose built dance studio with sound and lighting systems was completed in 2003. There is a floodlight all-weatherastroturf hockey and football pitch.

In 2009 the school added a new multi-use games area (M.U.G.A) which has four netball courts and three tennis courts, which are also used by the local Ottery St Mary tennis club.

== House system ==
There are four houses, which date to 1912, as witnessed by the old minute book of the Sports Committee. These provide the school with four large vertically grouped cohorts of students, with form groups separated by house rather than year.

The houses are named after local families: Coleridge, Kennaway, Patteson and Raleigh.

All houses have separate colours, which are used for inter-house events: red for Coleridge, blue for Kennaway, green for Patteson and purple for Raleigh. The school holds annual inter-house events, these include dance, musical and the 'Top Of The House' quiz.

== Notable former pupils ==
- Walter Raleigh (c. 1554–1618), writer, poet, soldier, courtier, explorer
- Samuel Taylor Coleridge (1772–1834), poet, critic, philosopher
- Paul Madden (born 1959), British diplomat
- Mary King (born 1961), eventer
- Murray McArthur (born 1966), actor
- Joanne Pavey (born 1973), long-distance runner

== See also ==
- List of the oldest schools in the United Kingdom
