= Cadbury, Devon =

Village in Devon, England

Coordinates: 50.82°N 03.54°W

Cadbury
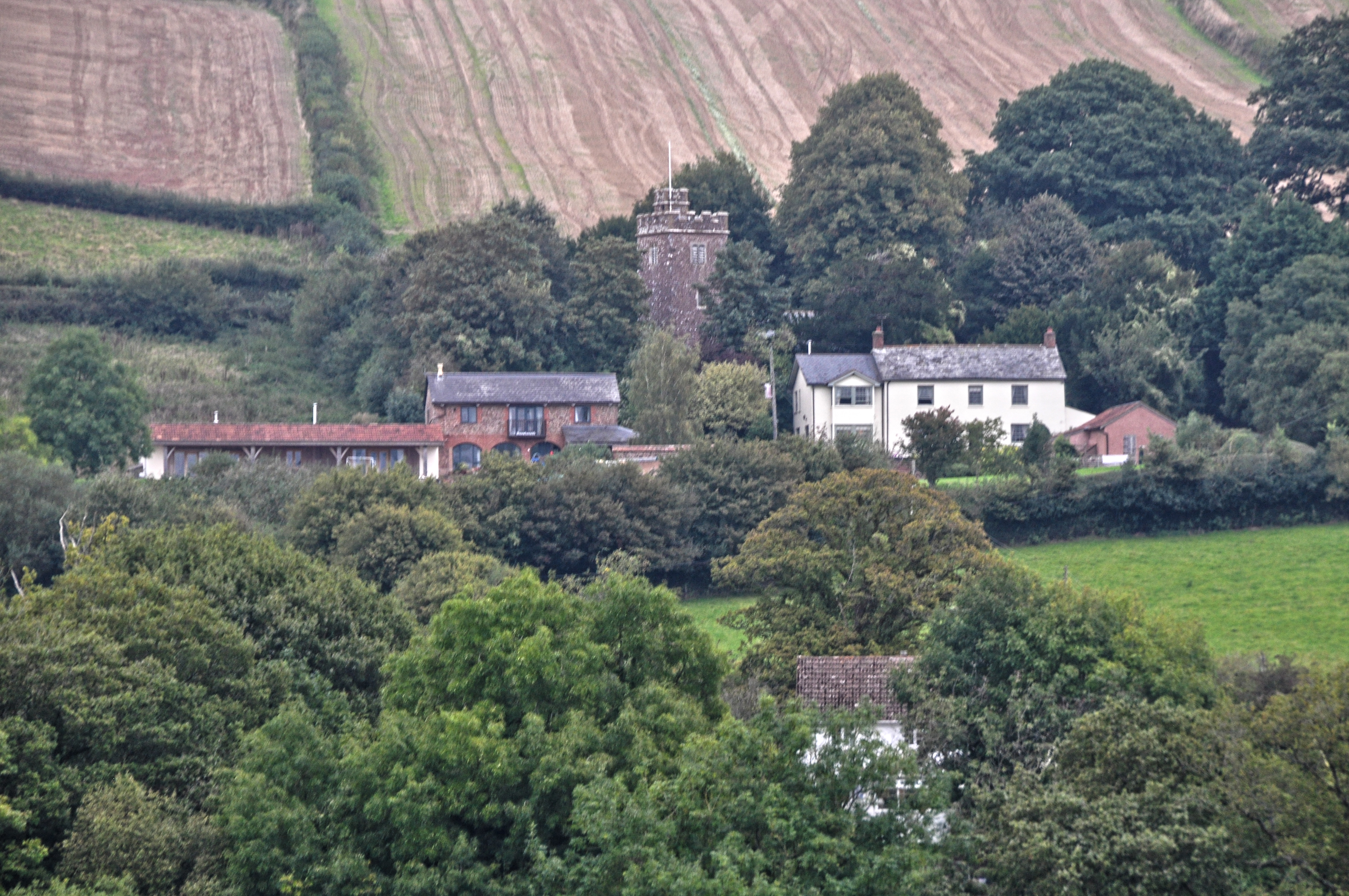

- Location within Devon
- OS grid reference: SS9104
- Civil parish: Cadbury
- District: Mid Devon
- Shire county: Devon
- Region: South West
- Country: England
- Sovereign state: United Kingdom
- Police: Devon and Cornwall
- Fire: Devon and Somerset
- Ambulance: South Western

Cadbury is a village and civil parish in Devon, England. Cadbury Castle is nearby.

The 15th-century Church of St Michael and All Angels features a Norman font. The church was restored in 1857 by William White, with Frederick Coleridge serving as its vicar from 1855 to 1906.
