= Old Town Hall, Ottery St Mary =

Municipal building in Ottery St Mary, Devon, England

Old Town Hall
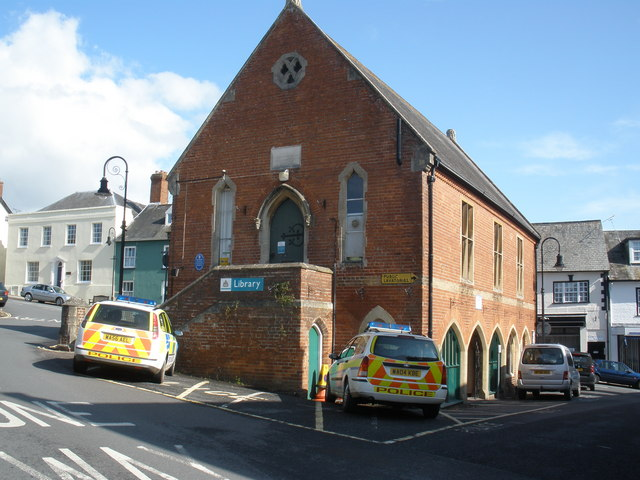
- The building in 2008

- Shown in Devon
- 50.7524°N 3.2785°W
- Location: Silver Street, Ottery St Mary

History
- Built: 1860

Site notes
- Architectural style: Gothic Revival style

The Old Town Hall is a former municipal building in Silver Street in Ottery St Mary, a town in Devon, in England. The structure is currently used as a local history museum.

== History ==
Following significant population growth, largely associated with its status as a market town, a local board was established in Ottery St Mary in 1850. At that time, there was no venue for public meetings in the town: the petty sessions were held in a room at the London Tavern. The local board therefore decided to commission a town hall and finance it by public subscription. The site that they selected was in the ancient market place known as The Flexton. The land was made available by the lord of the manor, Sir John Kennaway, 2nd Baronet, whose seat was at Escot House. The building was designed in the Gothic Revival style, built in red brick with stone dressings and was officially opened on 10 April 1860.

The design involved a symmetrical main frontage of five bays facing onto The Flexton. There were five arched openings with voussoirs on the ground floor and three mullioned and transomed windows on the first floor. It was gabled at both ends and there was a shorter block which projected out to the rear on the east side. At the west end, there was an external staircase leading up to an arched doorway with a hood mould on the first floor; the doorway was flanked by two tall windows with ogee heads and there was an oculus with tracery in the gable above. Internally, the principal room was a large assembly room.

In August 1862, shortly after the building opened, the town hall hosted a reception on behalf of the British Archaeological Association, which was presided over by the Justice of the Queen's Bench, Sir John Coleridge. The Ottery St Mary Choral Society held concerts in the building from 1869. The town hall was also used as a drill hall by 25th (Ottery St Mary) Devonshire Rifle Volunteer Corps which evolved to become F Company, 3rd Battalion Exeter and South Devon Volunteers in 1880. After the local board was succeeded by an urban district in 1894, the newly-formed council adapted the town hall for its council meetings and established a police station in the building. It also continued to be the venue for local magistrates' court hearings. A memorial, in form of a brick column surmounted by an orb and cross, which was intended to celebrate the Diamond Jubilee of Queen Victoria, was erected to the immediate west of the town hall in 1897.

The building remained the meeting place of the council throughout the first half of the 20th century, but ceased to be the local seat of government when the council moved to Hill House on the opposite side of The Flexton in 1951. The lord of the manor granted a lease over the building to the town in 1958, on condition that it remained in community use, and the building remained as such for the next 30 years. In 1985, it was converted for use by the town's library. It remained in that use until February 2017, when the library service relocated to the former Natwest Bank building in Silver Street.

Following extensive refurbishment works, the Ottery St Mary Heritage Society, which had operated through displays in a hotel since it was founded in 1999, moved into the old town hall. The building was officially re-opened by the mayor, Paul Bartlett, as the Ottery St Mary Heritage Museum on 6 October 2022. In June 2023, the town council granted the museum a 25-year lease over the building. The museum's exhibits include material associated with the poet, Samuel Taylor Coleridge, the diplomat, Ernest Mason Satow, and the novelist, William Makepeace Thackeray.
