= John James Hall =

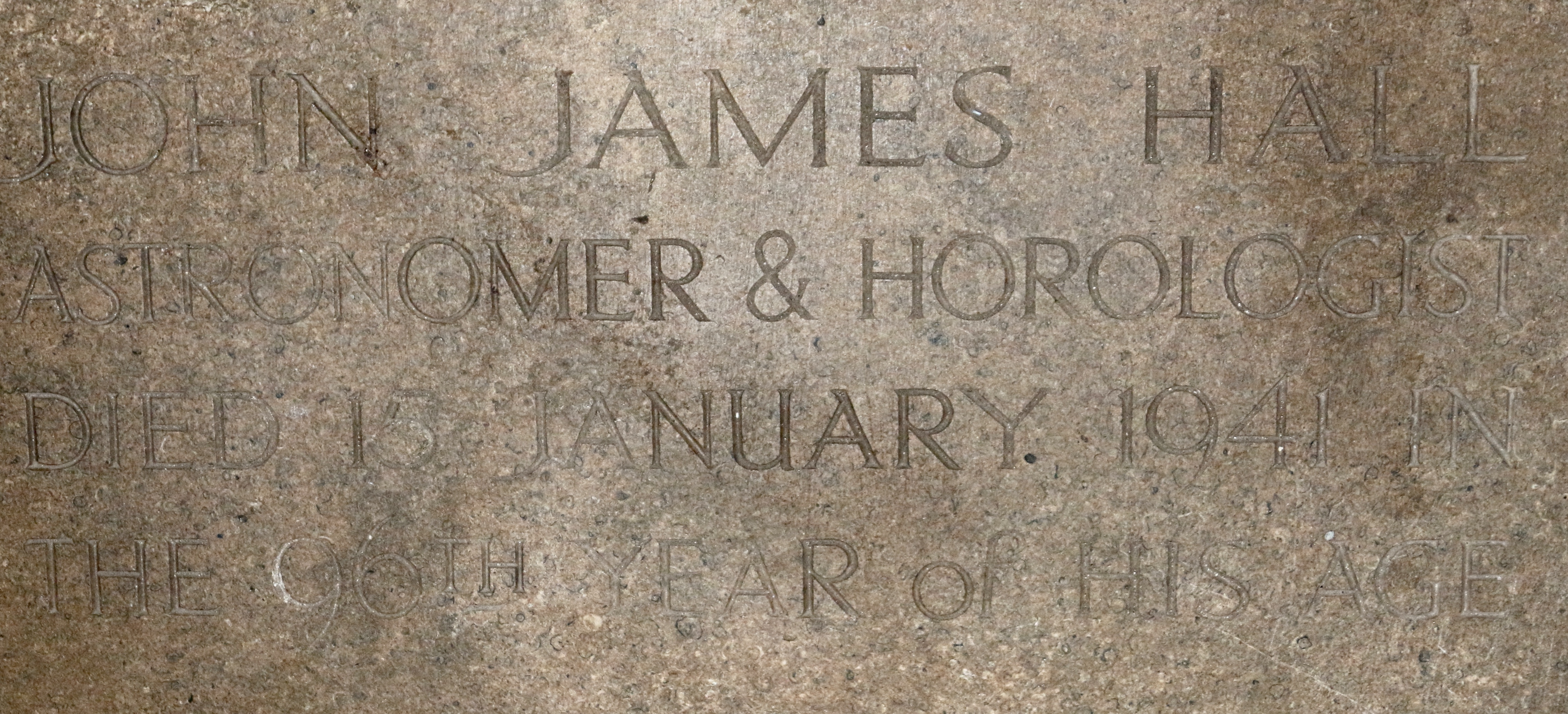
Memorial to John James Hall in the floor of the Syke Chantry in the north transept of Exeter Cathedral underneath the astronomical clock which he restored.

John James Hall FRAS (11 December 1845 – 15 January 1941) was an eminent horologist and author who restored many early clocks.

== Life ==
John James Hall spent his working life as an employee of the London and South Western Railway from 1865, but on retirement devoted his time to horology. He made over 200 contributions to The Horological Journal, The English Mechanic and World of Science, Watch and Clockmaker and other journals.

His best known accomplishments were the restoration of the fourteenth-century astronomical clocks in St Mary's Church, Ottery St Mary in 1907 and Exeter Cathedral in 1910.

He designed a new clock for Exeter Public Library which was set going in 1931. One of his major areas of study was the life and work of Jacob Lovelace of Exeter. He also published his complete articles in Fasces Exonienses.

He was elected a Fellow of the Royal Astronomical Society on 10 February 1899. He was also a Fellow of the British Horological Institute, the Meteorological Society, the National Geographic Society of Washington, and the Societe d’Astronomie et du Physique du Globe, Bruxelles.

His ashes were interred in the Syke Chantry in the north transept of Exeter Cathedral, below the clock he had restored.
