= Pixie Day =

Pixie Day is a tradition that takes place in Ottery St. Mary, England, annually on the Saturday nearest Mid-Summer's Day in June. Dating from 1954, and based on a pamphlet written by R. F. Delderfield for the 500th anniversary of the installation of the bells of the Church of St. Mary, the event commemorates a legend of Ottery St. Mary's 'pixies' being banished from the town (where they caused havoc) to a local cave known as 'Pixies' Parlour'.

The celebrations begin in the early afternoon when a large fête takes place on the Land of Caanan park. At 6 pm the celebrations focus on Ottery's town square. Hundreds of 'pixies' (made up of local Cubs and Brownies dressed in pixie attire) capture the St. Mary's church bell ringers and drag them from the church to the Land of Canaan, where a reenactment of the pixies' banishment takes place.

== The legend ==
As told in Delderfield's The pixies' revenge; or, the threat to the bells of St. Mary's Church, Ottery, the story states that hundreds of years ago, in the early days of Christianity, the people of East Devon used to believe in pixies and spirits. A local bishop, Bishop Grandisson, decided to build a church in Otteri (later Ottery St. Mary), and commissioned a set of bells for the church to be cast in iron in the bells works in Wales. The bishop was so concerned about the bells getting destroyed that he organised an escort of monks to bring the bells to Otteri.

On hearing of this, the pixies were worried, as they knew that once the bells were installed in the church, it would be the death knell of their rule over the land. So they cast a spell over the monks and redirected them from the Otteri road, towards the road leading them to cliffs overlooking the sea at Sidmouth. Just as the monks were about to fall over the cliff, one of them stubbed his toe on a rock and said "God bless my soul", and immediately the spell was broken.

The bells were then brought to Otteri and installed in the church. However the pixie spell was not completely broken; each year on a day in June the 'pixies' come out and capture the town's bell ringers (and in some years the parish council) and imprison them in Pixies' Parlour to be rescued by the Vicar of Ottery St. Mary. This legend is re-enacted each year by the Cub and Brownie groups of Ottery St. Mary.

The original Pixies' Parlour (a cave in sandstone) can be found along the banks of the River Otter, about a mile south of the Otter Road bridge in Ottery St. Mary.

== See also ==
- Songs of the Pixies
