= Charles Coleridge =

English cricketer

Charles Edward Coleridge (2 June 1827 – 1 May 1875) was an English amateur cricketer who played from 1848 to 1852.

Born in Eton, Buckinghamshire, he was mainly associated with Oxford University and Hampshire and made 11 known appearances in important matches.

Coleridge went up to Balliol College, Oxford, in 1846 and graduated in 1850. He then was admitted to the Middle Temple and was called to the bar in 1853. He died in Westminster.
