= Benjamin Haughton (artist) =

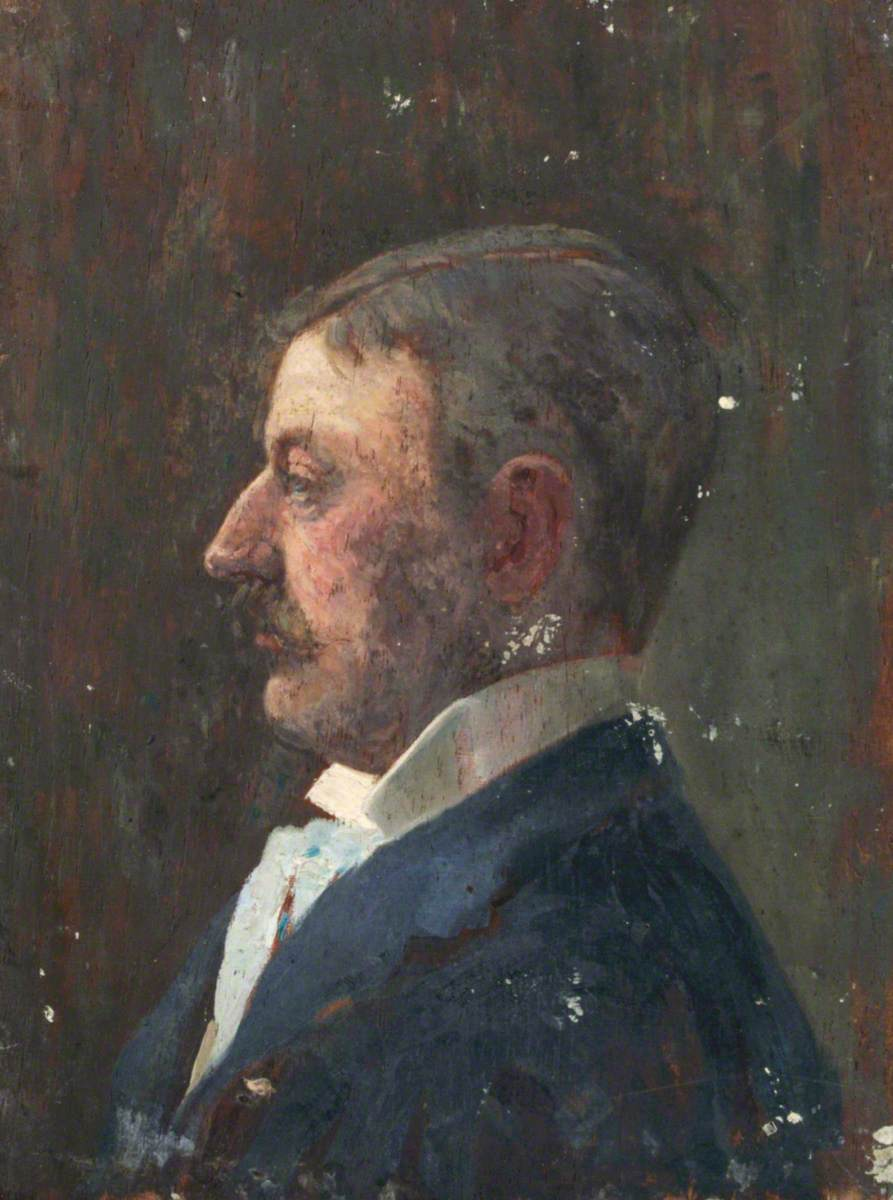
A self-portrait of Benjamin Haughton

Benjamin Haughton RBA (13 September 1865–1924) was an English landscape painter. He was born in Little Sutton, Cheshire and graduated from Caius College, Cambridge with a degree in chemistry in 1886. His father wished him to become a doctor but Benjamin decided to travel to the United States where he worked a number of jobs in Dakota during which time he started to paint. After a bout of rheumatic fever, he decided to return to Europe and become a landscape painter.

He studied under Joseph Walter West and from 1889 at Hubert von Herkomer's Art School at Bushey. He lived in several places in southern England, as well as Tuscany. In 1894, he married Janet Mason, with whom he had one daughter. He worked for a time as the manager of a military hospital in Exeter but the strain of the work lead to a "very severe" break down, beginning in October 1916, which permanently impacted his health. He died at his home in Devon in 1924.

His art encompasses a range of styles but focused on landscapes, particularly those featuring trees and woodland. Throughout his career he exhibited at the Royal Academy of Arts, the Royal Society of British Artists, the Paris Salon and the New Gallery. He was associated with, but not formally part of, the Newlyn School. Fellow artist Herbert Alexander claimed, "I doubt if there ever was a landscapist who brought a deeper knowledge of nature to his art." The 50th anniversary and centenary of his death were commemorated at Portsmouth City Museum by exhibitions showcasing his work.

== Gallery ==
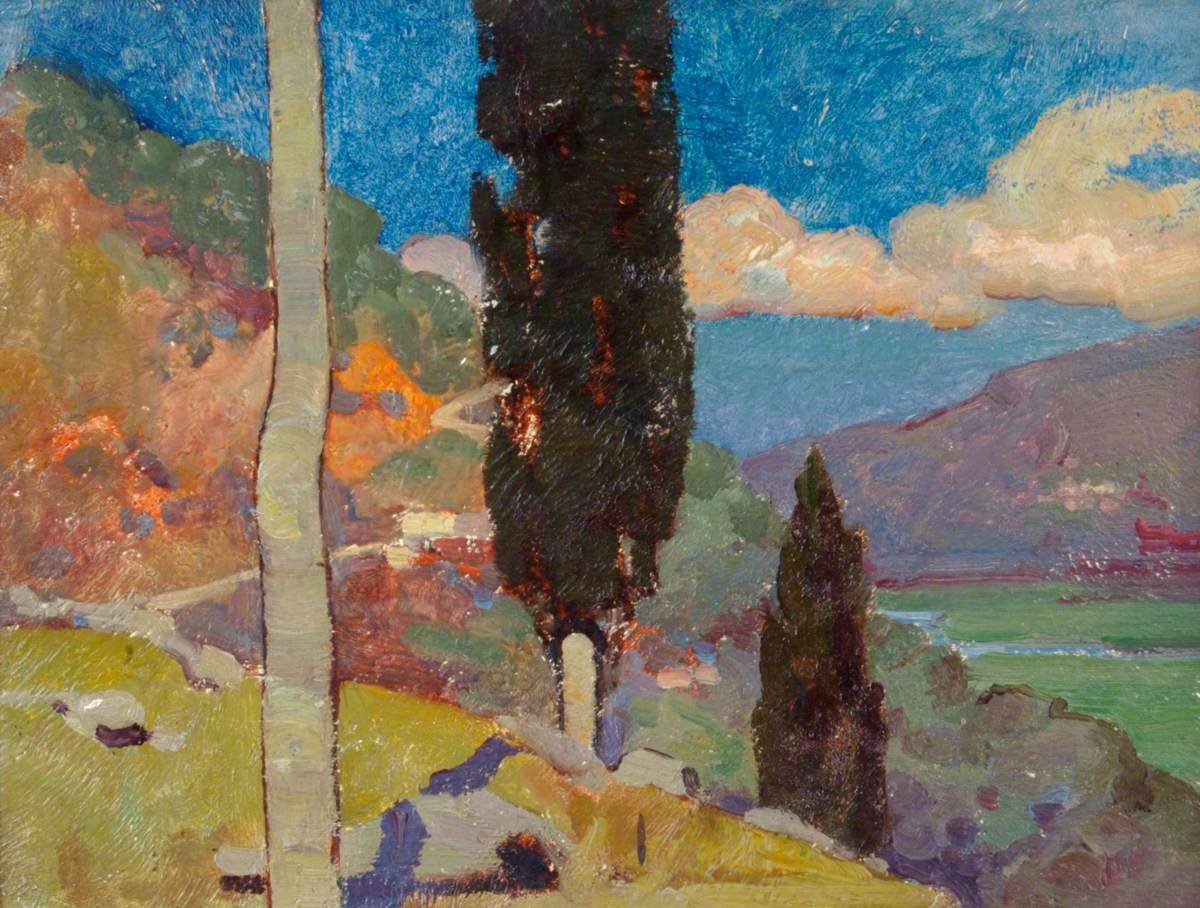
View in Liguria, Bay of La Spezia

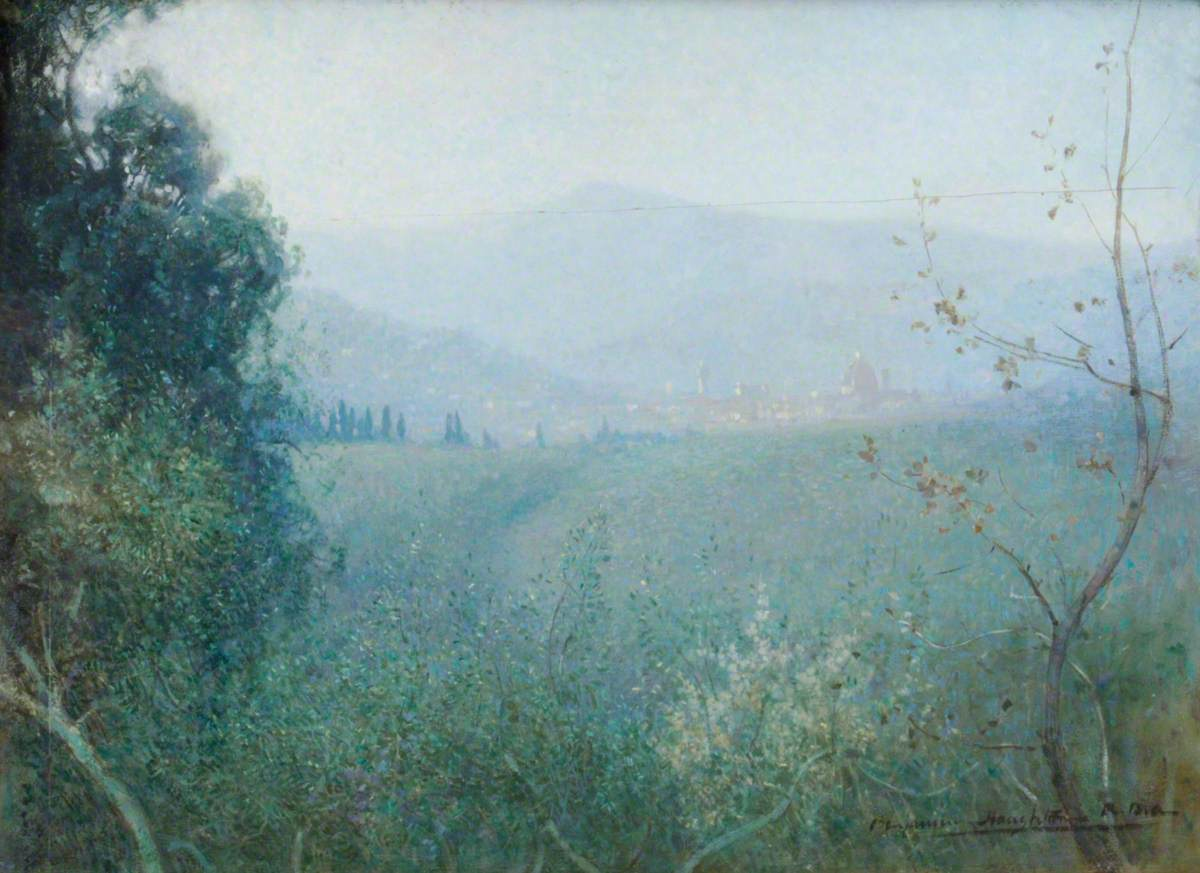
City of Dreams

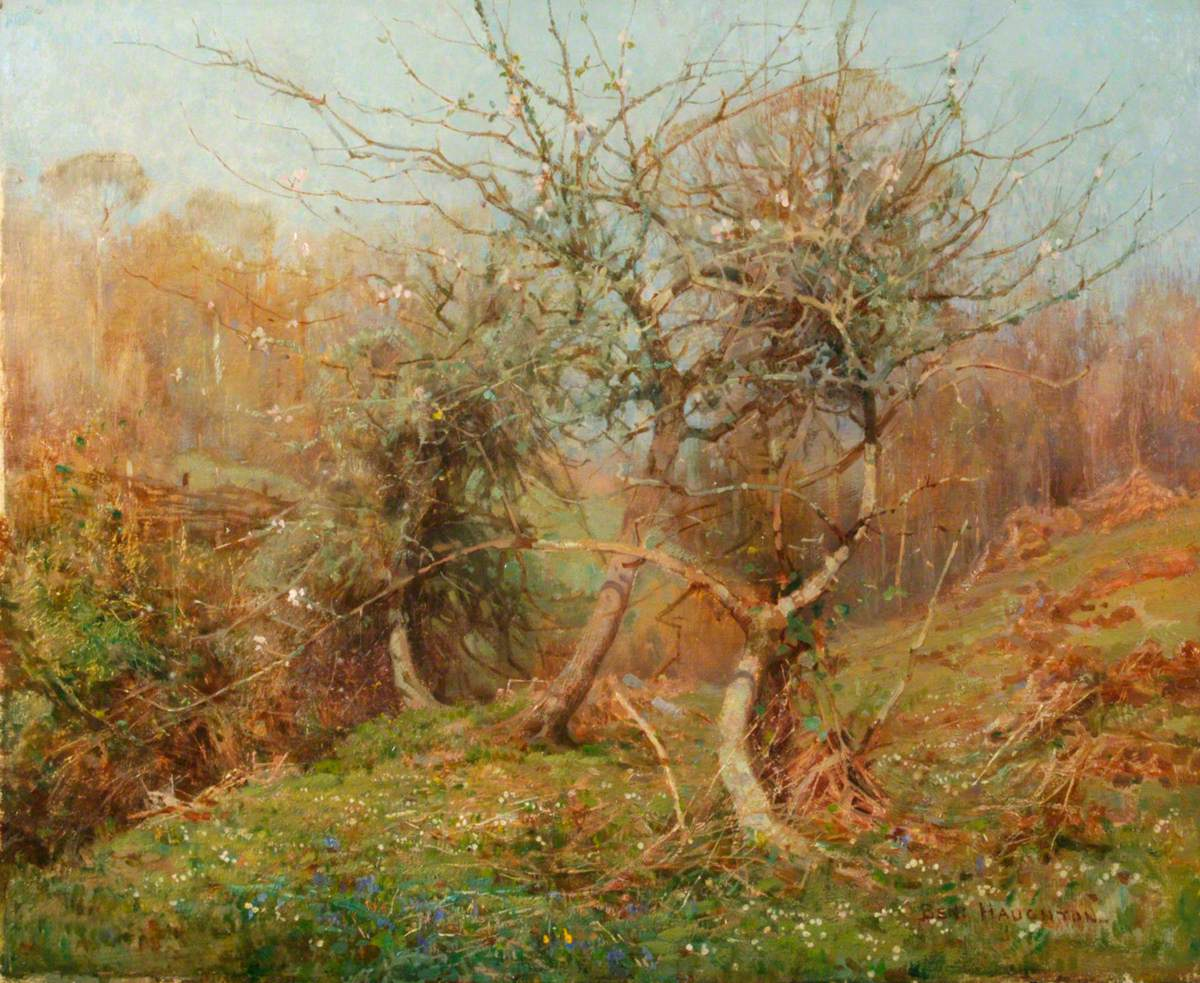
Breath of Spring

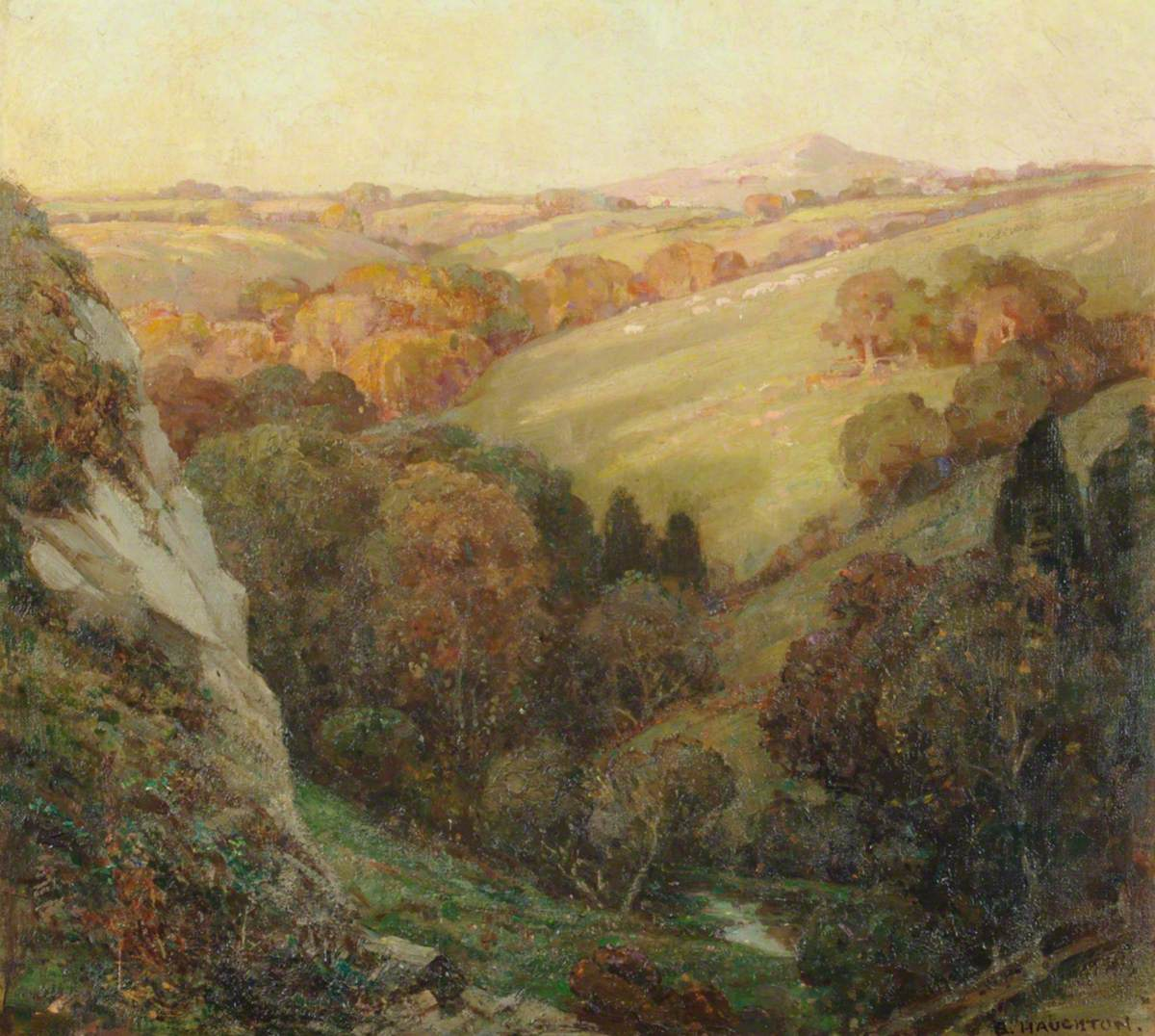
Russet and Gold
