= Exeter Cathedral astronomical clock =

15th-century astronomical clock in Exeter Cathedral, England

Coordinates: 50.723°N 3.5305°W

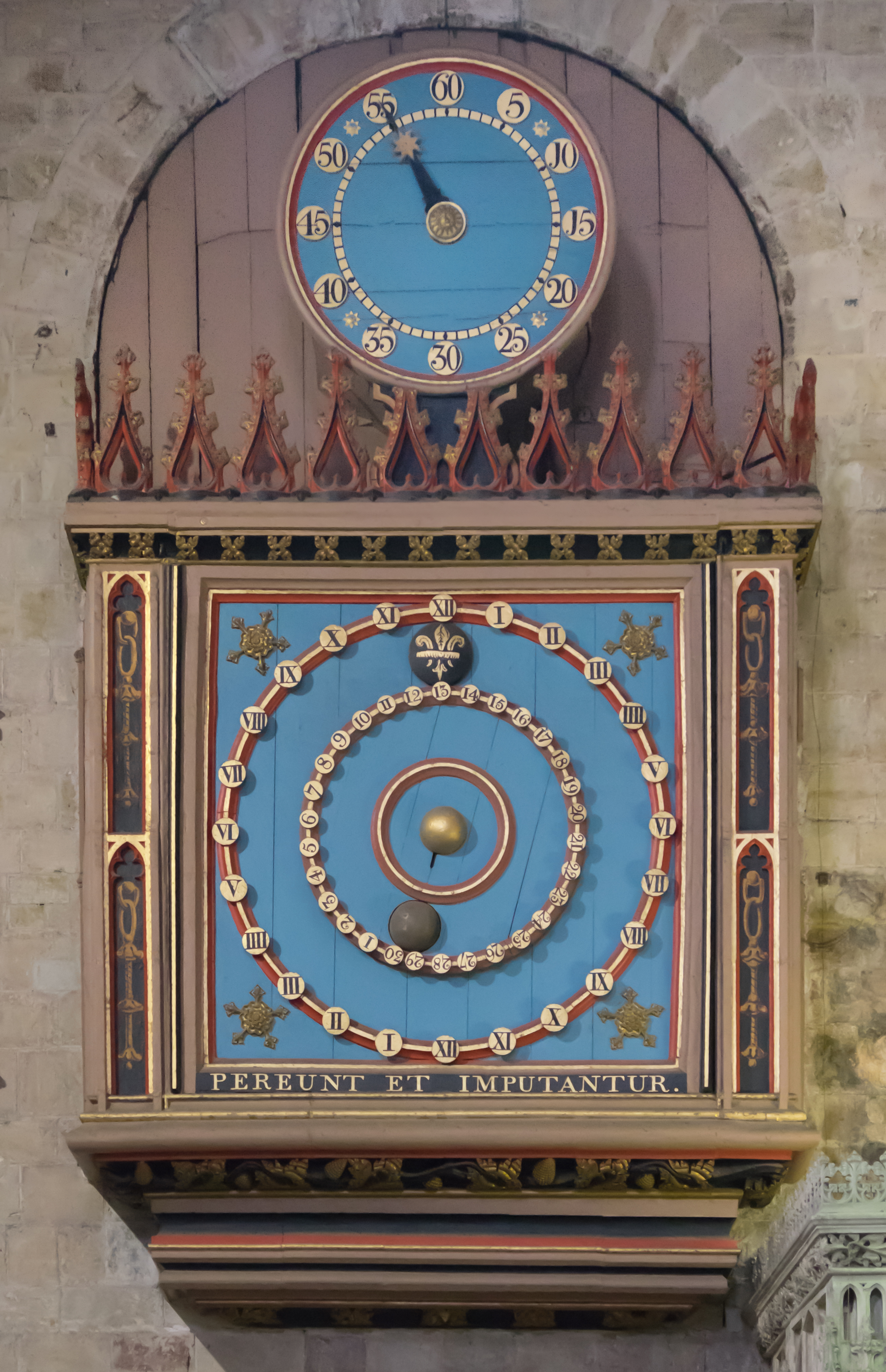
Exeter Cathedral Astronomical Clock.

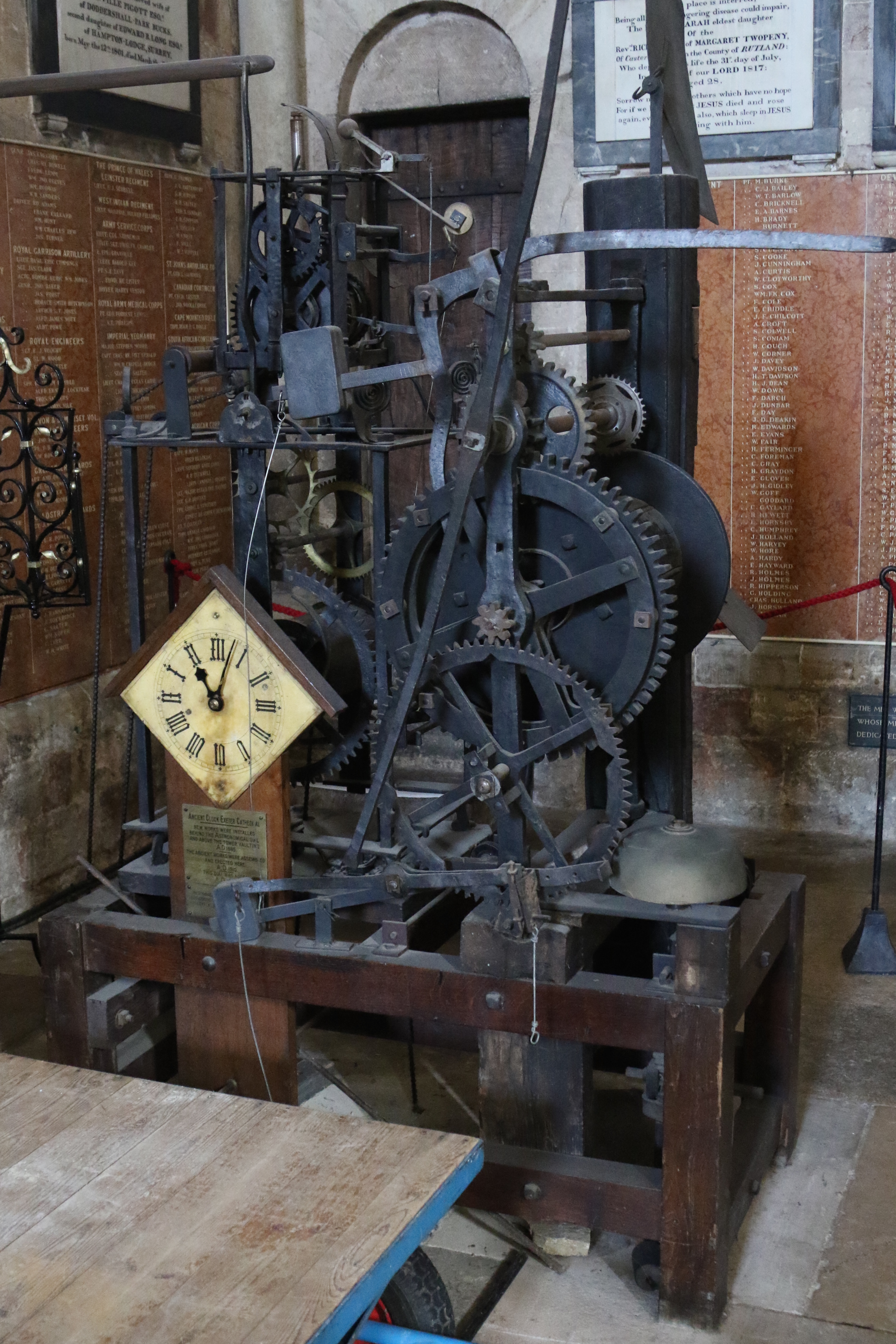
Early mechanism for the astronomical clock which was removed in 1885, but restored by John James Hall in its current position on the floor of the north transept in 1910.

The Exeter Cathedral Astronomical Clock is a fifteenth-century astronomical clock in Exeter Cathedral, England. It displays the hour of the day, the day of the lunar month and the phase of the moon. The modern clock mechanism was installed in 1885 by Gillett & Bland of Croydon, and restored in 1910.

== History and description ==
The clock is thought to date from around 1484.

The outermost numbered circle of the main dial is decorated with a fleur-de-lis which represents the Sun, and which orbits the dial once every 24 hours. This indicates the hour of the day, counted from I to XII in Roman numerals in first the right and then the left hemispheres of the clockface. This is an example of a 24-hour analog dial. The tail of the Sun's fleur-de-lis points to the day in the lunar month on the inner numbered ring. The half-black, half-silver Moon inside the lunar month ring rotates on its axis to show the correct phase of the moon. The Earth is represented as a fixed golden ball in the centre of the dial. The Latin inscription "Pereunt et imputantur" below the main dial may be translated as "The hours pass and are reckoned to our account".

A small bell located behind the clock dial chimes the quarter-hours. On the hour, this is followed by the striking of the Peter Bell in the tower above.

In 1759 the smaller upper dial was added, with a single hand to indicate the minutes.

The clock-room is behind the dial on the north wall of the transept, and still houses the clock mechanism. Access is via a doorway visible in the stone wall directly beneath the clock. Legend suggests that the round hole cut in the bottom of the door was for the cathedral cat to gain entry to keep the clock clear of mice and rats. The modern clock mechanism was installed in 1885 by Gillett & Bland of Croydon.

The clock was restored in 1910 by John James Hall FRAS.

The clock is reputed to be the source of the nursery rhyme Hickory Dickory Dock, probably inspired by the round hole in the door described above.

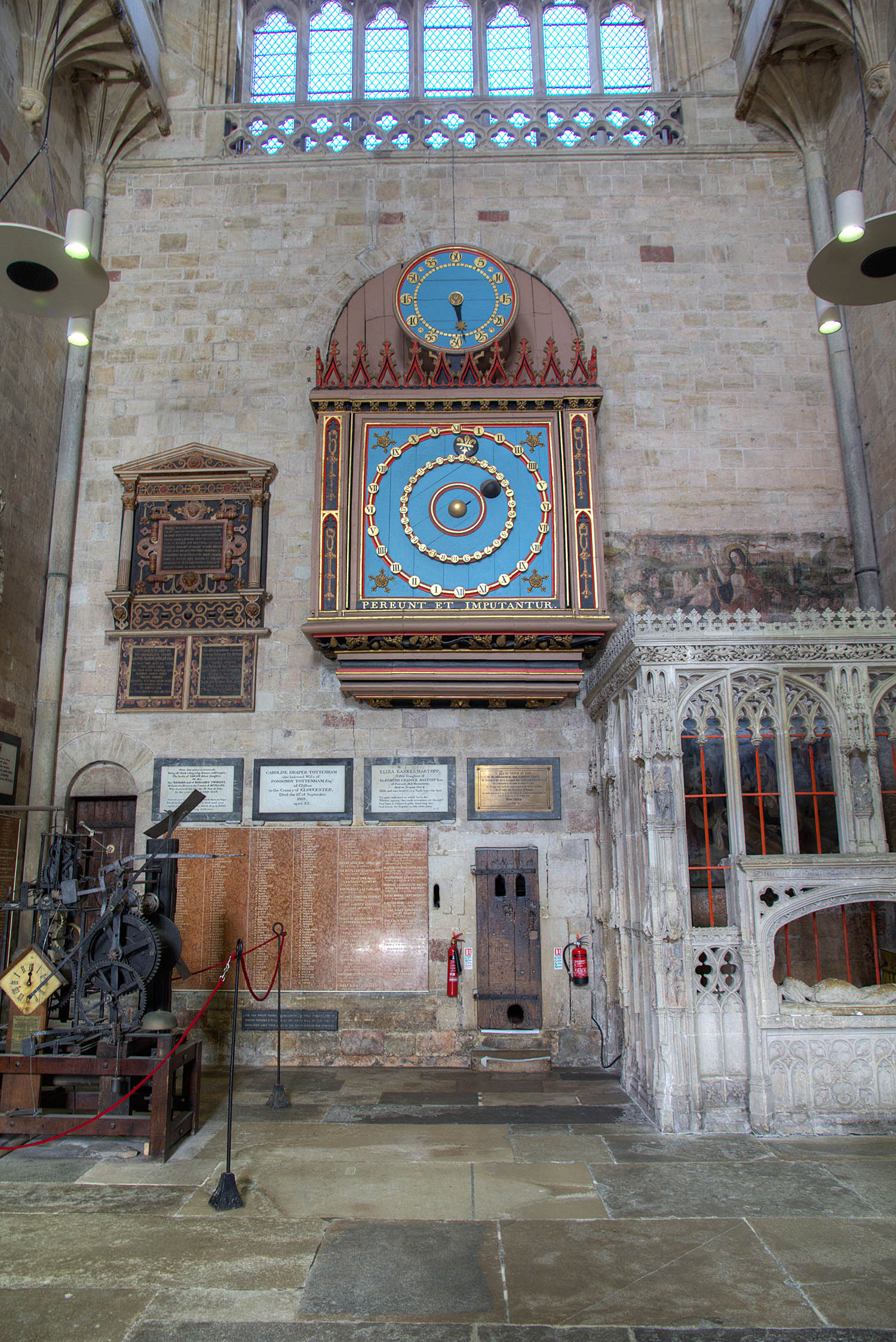
The door under the astronomical clock has an access hole for cats.
