= Fossil echinoids =

Fossilised remains of sea urchins

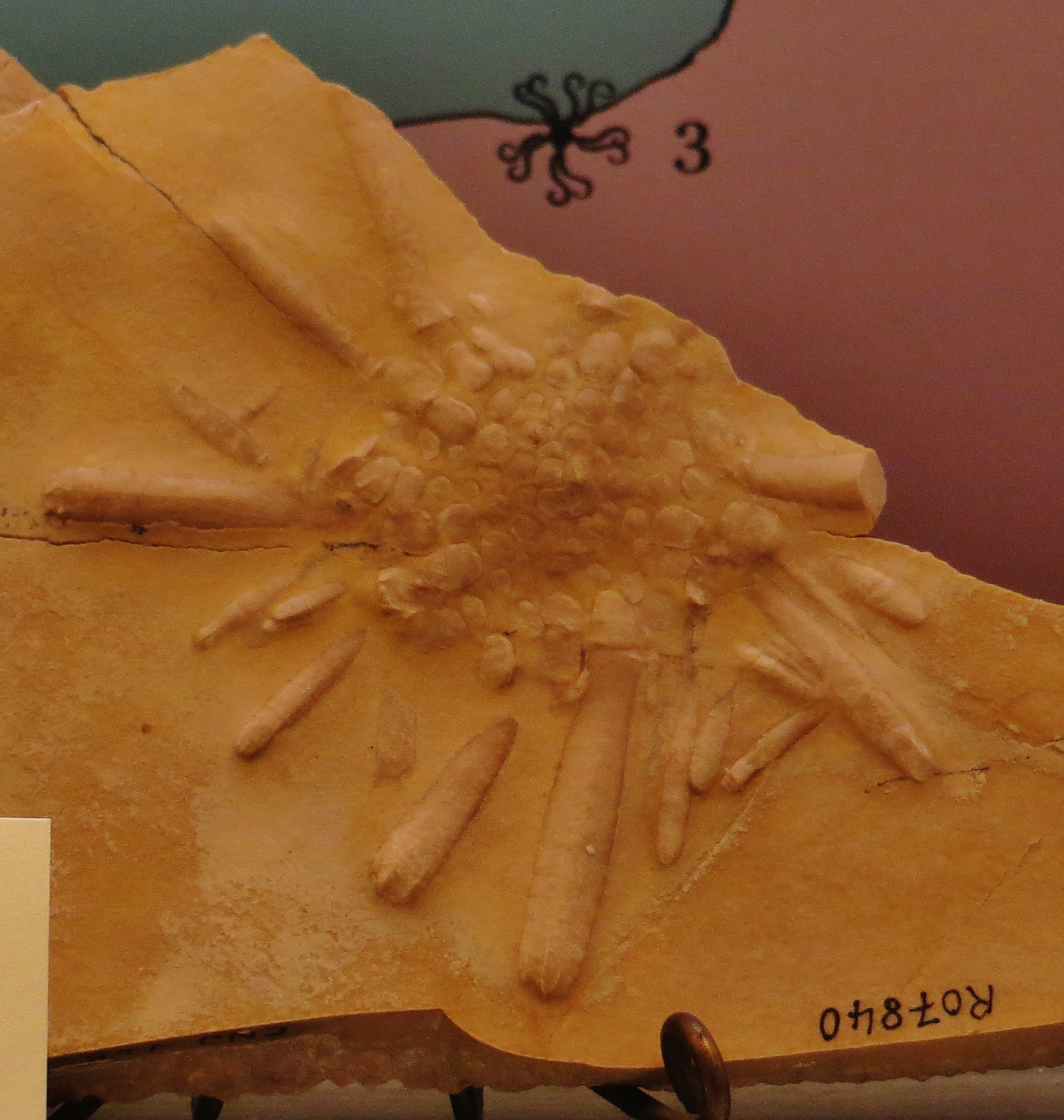
Fossil of Acrocidaris, an extinct sea urchin

Echinoid fossils are the fossilised remains of sea urchins, spiny marine invertebrates that live on the seabed. Humans have been interested in these fossils for millennia, have considered them lucky, have imbued them with magical powers and linked them to their deities.

== Echinoid fossils ==
The main feature of echinoid fossils is the set of five ambulacra on the test radiating out from a central point, forming a distinctive five-petalled pattern. The earliest echinoid fossils date from the late Ordovician period, some 450 Mya. The group has a rich fossil record, their hard tests made of calcite plates and their spines being found in rocks from every period since then. Echinoids from the Paleozoic era had thin tests and their fossils are often incomplete, consisting of groups of plates or isolated spines. Later echinoids had more robust tests and fossilised well, usually with the spines detached from the test. Fossils of echinoids are common in rocks from the Jurassic and Cretaceous age, especially from late Cretaceous chalk. In the White Cliffs of Dover in southern England, the echinoid fossils that are present can be used for dating the various chalk strata in which they occur. This is because they are relatively abundant and well-preserved compared to other fossilised animals and can be differentiated by type between different ages.

== Use in culture ==
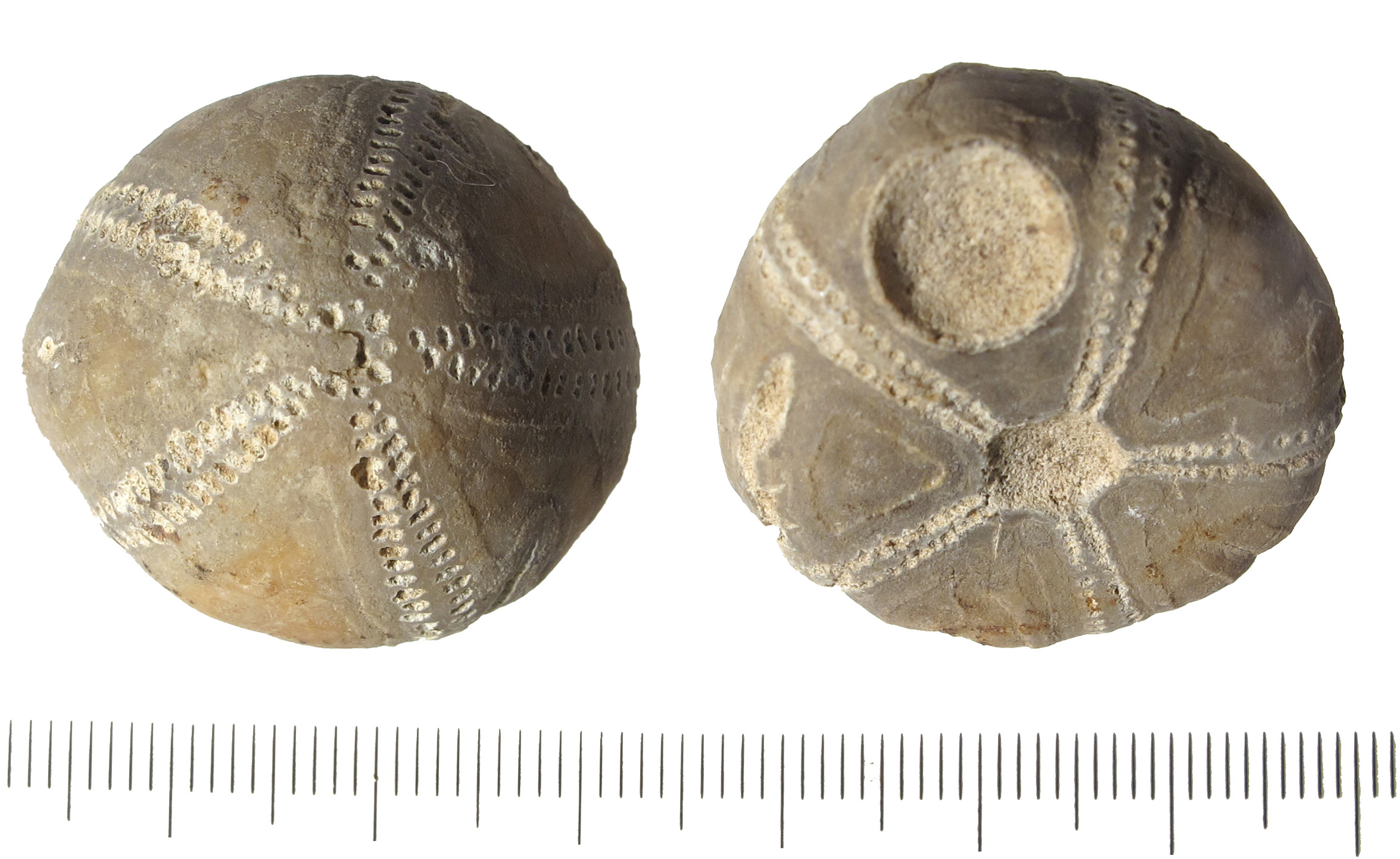
A fossil sea urchin found on a Middle Saxon site in Lincolnshire, thought to have been used as an amulet

Humans have long had a propensity for collecting fossil echinoids, and these fossils are often found at archaeological sites. The fossils played a part in both Celtic and Norse mythology, were venerated, associated with burials, woven into myths and legends and used when making tools and decorative objects. These fossils are commonly known as thunderstones, fairy loaves or shepherds' crowns.

Echinoid fossils are sometimes found associated with archaeological sites. The earliest known example in England is an Acheulean hand axe from the Middle Pleistocene found in Kent. The craftsman had evidently chosen to use this flint for his tool; the exposed area around the sea urchin's jaws known as Aristotle's lantern are clearly visible. Similar examples are known from France, Western and Central Europe, and Northern Africa; they span Paleolithic, Neolithic, Bronze Age and Iron Age times.
