= Clerk of assize =

A clerk of assize was a clerk of the assize courts of England and Wales, a position which existed from at least 1285 to 1971, when the Courts Act 1971 eliminated the assize courts. Originally the judges' private clerks tasked with enrolling pleas, the clerks grew into the heads of administrative departments tasked with keeping each assize running smoothly, and at one point sat as judges in their own right.

== History ==
The first known reference to clerks of assize was made in 1285 when a procedural rule was created stating that justices on assize should be accompanied by a clerk tasked with enrolling pleas. The first few sets of assize clerks were the private clerks of the judges themselves, but by 1380 records show that the Western Circuit had a permanent employed clerk, Simon of Lichfield, a barrister of the Old Temple. From then onwards the position was normally filled by barristers. Although a 1541 statute prohibited a clerk from actively practicing as a barrister while serving, the position offered a chance to make connections with the Westminster judges and of power in local politics, and records show that in 1657 the Oxford Circuit clerkship, for example, changed hands for the then-massive sum of £2,575.

The clerks' income was initially the fees paid by parties to have a case come before the court, and as a result, their pay depended on the business of the court itself. By the 1650s there were over 100 nisi prius cases on each circuit, worth approximately 10s in fees, along with 50 criminal cases worth between 2s to 16s. Clerks were expected to pay for the expenses of the judge and the bailiff and Marshall's fees, but despite this still prospered: by the 1660s some were making more money than the assize judges themselves. The clerk positions eventually ceased to exist in 1971, when the Courts Act 1971 eliminated the assize courts.

== Duties and Restrictions ==
Clerks were initially tasked only with drafting and accepting pleas, but for a period from the late 16th to mid-17th centuries they worked as full-fledged assize judges to cut down the workload. They eventually headed up an entire department of administrators to keep the assize running smoothly, and manuals written for clerks in the late 17th century attest to the complexity of their duties, which only ended when every assize plea had been written, accepted, and filed. Little is known about their assistants: almost all were legally trained, but their duties and identities remain unknown. Assistants were appointed by the clerk, with the approval of the assize judges.

When a barrister became a clerk he was statutorily debarred from acting as a barrister. Exceptions were occasionally made: at the 1682 Bedford Assize John Luke, the clerk represented Robert Chambers for an unspecified offence.

== Bibliography ==
- Cockburn, J. S. (1969). "Seventeenth-Century Clerks of Assize – Some Anonymous Members of the Legal Profession". American Journal of Legal History. 13 (4). Temple University: 315–32. doi:10.2307/844182. ISSN 0002-9319. JSTOR 844182.
