= West Hill, Devon =

Village in Devon, England

Coordinates: 50.7379°N 3.3185°W

West Hill
- Location within Devon
- Civil parish: West Hill
- District: East Devon
- Shire county: Devon
- Region: South West
- Country: England
- Sovereign state: United Kingdom
- Post town: Ottery St. Mary
- Postcode district: EX11
- Dialling code: 01404
- Police: Devon and Cornwall
- Fire: Devon and Somerset
- Ambulance: South Western
- UK Parliament: Honiton and Sidmouth

West Hill is a village in the East Devon district of Devon, England. The village lies approximately 2 miles south west of Ottery St Mary, its nearest town. West Hill can be accessed by the nearby A30 road. The village has a primary school and a village hall, which is located by the local convenience store in the centre of the village. Previously part of the parish of Ottery St Mary, West Hill was made into a parish in its own right in April 2017. The parish had a population of 2,109 in 2021.

== Notable people ==
- Peter Garwood (1931–2020), HM Inspector of Schools, lived at West Hill from 1990 to 2020
