= Ottery St Mary =

Town in Devon, England

Coordinates: 50.752°N 3.279°W

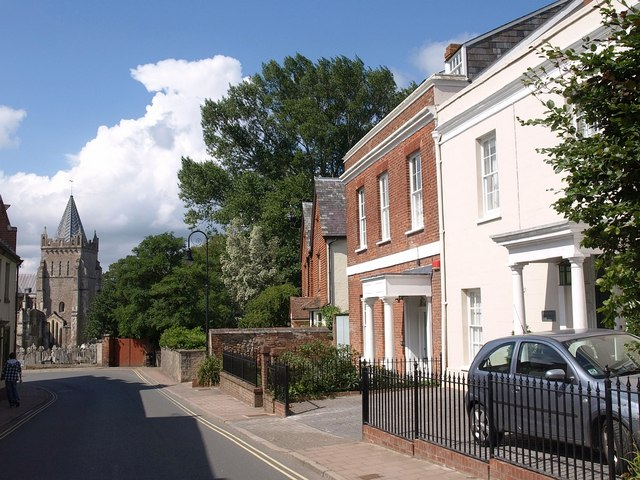
- Paternoster Row

- Location within Devon
- Population: 4,898 (2011)
- Demonym: Ottregian
- OS grid reference: SY0995
- Civil parish: Ottery St Mary
- District: East Devon
- Shire county: Devon
- Region: South West
- Country: England
- Sovereign state: United Kingdom
- Post town: OTTERY ST. MARY
- Postcode district: EX11
- Dialling code: 01404
- Police: Devon and Cornwall
- Fire: Devon and Somerset
- Ambulance: South Western
- UK Parliament: Honiton and Sidmouth

Ottery St Mary, known as "Ottery", is a town and civil parish in the East Devon district of Devon, England, on the River Otter, about 10 miles (16 km) east of Exeter on the B3174. At the 2001 census, the parish, which includes the villages of Metcombe, Fairmile, Alfington, Tipton St John, Wiggaton, and (until 2017) West Hill, had a population of 7,692. The population of the urban area alone at the 2011 census was 4,898. In 2021 the parish had a population of 7,986.

There are two electoral wards in Ottery (Rural and Town). The total population of both wards, including the adjacent civil parish of Aylesbeare, at the 2011 census was 9,022.

Ottery is home to a number of independent, local businesses which are situated on Mill Street, Silver Street and Yonder Street. An area known as 'The Square' is at the centre of the town.

== Etymology ==
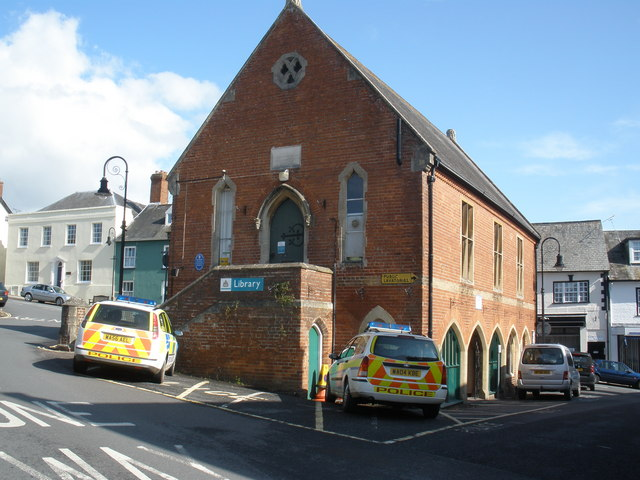
Old Town Hall, Ottery St Mary

The name Ottery is first attested in the Domesday Book of 1086, where it appears as 'Otri' and 'Otrei'. 'Oteri Sancte Marie' is first mentioned in 1242. The town takes its name from the River Otter (named after the animal) on which it stands. The town belonged to the church of St Mary in Rouen in 1086, hence 'St Mary'.

Within the parish lies Chettisholt, noted as one of the fairly small number of Common Brittonic place-names surviving in England. The first element of this name is the Brittonic word which survives in modern Welsh as coed ("wood"); the last is the Old English word holt, also meaning "wood", added to the name when its original meaning had been lost due to the dominant language of the area switching from Brittonic to Old English.

== History ==
Archaeological excavations in 2014, in advance of a housing development at Island Farm, uncovered a medieval longhouse dating to AD.1250–1350.

Ottery's notable buildings include the Tumbling Weir and St Mary's church. The town is the site of The King's School, formerly a grammar school but now a comprehensive school, founded in 1545 by Henry VIII, and of Ottery St Mary Primary School. The Old Town Hall now accommodates the local heritage museum.

The Chanter's House is a Grade II listed building. The Listing summary states: "Dates from the days of the College but little trace of antiquity remains, mainly enclosed by large brick outer additions by Butterfield including a 3rd storey, extending also above the C18 ... The C17 centre is the former Heath's Court ..." It dates from the 17th century, incorporating parts of the former Precentor's house, known as Heath's Court. In 1645, Oliver Cromwell held a convention in the house's dining room, and Thomas Fairfax stayed at the house from October to December in that year. The building served as the headmaster's lodging for the King's School. Samuel Taylor Coleridge grew up here after his father, Rev. John Coleridge, moved there after being appointed headmaster and vicar of St Mary's Church in 1769. The property remained in the Coleridge family until 2006, when it was sold to Max Norris who completed a major renovation over five years.

A report in June 2020 describes The Chanter's House as having ten bedrooms, 11 bathrooms and a library (built by Coleridge) with 22,000 books, purchased with the property in 2006. The grounds include a "walled gardens, stables, tennis court, a Victorian palm house and an aviary, as well as over 21 acres of gardens, woodland and streams ... [as well as] a lodge and a coach house." A news item states that the library includes "diaries, notes and collections of poems, including The Rime of the Ancient Mariner" by Samuel Taylor Coleridge.

== Church ==
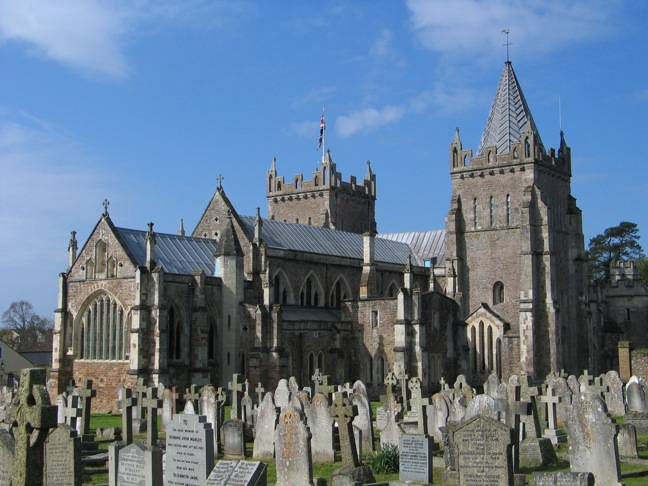
St Mary's Church viewed from north-east

The parish church of St Mary's has been referred to as "a miniature Exeter Cathedral". Like the cathedral it is cruciform in plan, with transepts formed by towers.

Nikolaus Pevsner described the building as "lying large and low like a tired beast". It is 163 feet (50 m) long, and the towers are 71 feet (22 m) high. It was consecrated in 1260, at which time the manor and patronage of the church belonged to Rouen Cathedral, as it had from before the Norman invasion. Pevsner assumed that the tower-transepts and the outer walls of the chancel date back to 1260, and that the towers were built in imitation of those at Exeter.

In 1335 John Grandisson, (1327–1369), Bishop of Exeter, bought the manor and advowson from Rouen, and two years later converted the church into a collegiate foundation with forty members. He rebuilt much of the church, and the present nave, chancel, aisles and Lady chapel date from this time. The nave is of five bays, and the chancel, unusually long in proportion, is of six, with vestry chapels to the north and south.

The church is noted for its painted ceiling and early 16th-century fan vaulted aisle, the Dorset Aisle, designed and commissioned by Cecily Bonville, 7th Baroness Harington, whose first husband was Thomas Grey, 1st Marquess of Dorset.

The building was restored in 1850 by architect William Butterfield. His alterations included lowering the floor level of the transepts, crossing and western part of the chancel to that of the nave, and making the east end, designed for the needs of the collegiate foundation, more suitable for parochial use.

The church houses the Ottery St Mary Astronomical Clock, one of the oldest surviving mechanical clocks in the country. It is generally attributed to Bishop Grandisson and follows Ptolemaic cosmology placing the Earth at the centre of the Solar System.

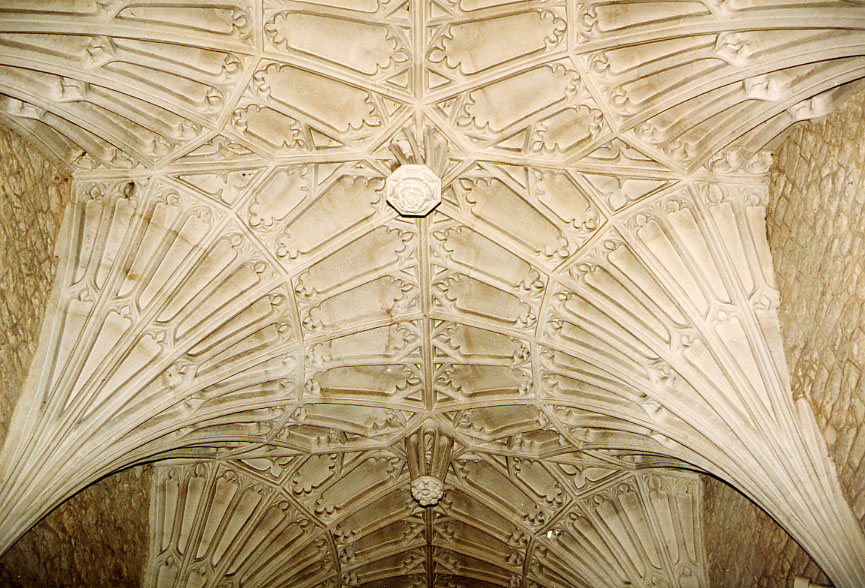
The fan vaulting

The church has ten misericords dating from the building of the church in 1350, five showing the arms of Bishop John de Grandisson. The church interior also has two medieval carved stone portrayals of the Green Man. There is a small stone plaque commemorating the poet Samuel Taylor Coleridge, who was born here on 21 October 1772, in the south churchyard wall. Other interesting features include the tombs of Otho de Grandisson and his wife, the altar screen, sedilia, and a wooden eagle given by Bishop Grandisson.

Ottery St Mary parish registers, which begin in 1601, are held in the Devon Record Office.

This is a Grade I listed building, one of 107 Listed sites in the area. The summary provides this information: "Consecrated by Bishop Bronescombe in 1260. Altered and added to by Bishop Grandison circa 1330. Mainly Early English ... 2 towers above transepts .... The interior was restored drastically mid C19 by Butterfield and others". The work in the 1300s included "rebuilding of the nave, and addition of the Lady Chapel at the east end and two chantry chapels either side of the chancel" according to a reliable source. Other renovations were completed circa 1520: "principally expansion of the north nave aisle, complete with elaborate, fan-vaulted ceiling and pendant bosses".

== Schools ==
The town's primary schools are West Hill Primary School which was established in 1876 and now has around 210 pupils, and Ottery St Mary Primary School with around 356 pupils.

The King's School, located on the outskirts of the town, was established as a choir school by Bishop John Grandisson in 1335, but was replaced by a grammar school by Henry VIII in 1545. It became a comprehensive school in 1982 and is now a government-endowed Sports College with access to facilities shared by the public – namely the LED Sports Centre. The school has 1,100 students and 80 teachers.

== Local traditions ==
=== Tar Barrels ===
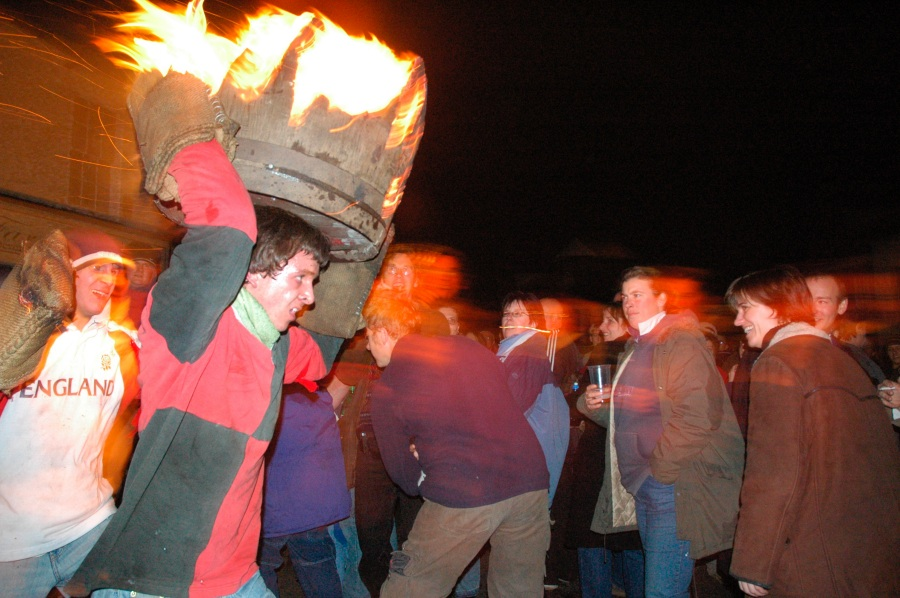
Tar Barrels, 5 November 2005

The town typically stages annual events around Guy Fawkes Night when, in a tradition dating from the 17th century, barrels soaked in tar are set alight, and carried aloft through parts of the town by residents.

The festivities begin in the early evening with children's, youths' and women's events, culminating in the men's event when a total of 17 barrels are lit outside each of the four public houses in the town. (Originally there were 12 public houses in the town). The barrels, increasing in size up to 30 kg, are carried through the town centre, often packed with onlookers, in an exhilarating and risky spectacle. Only those born in the town, or who have lived there for most of their lives, may carry a barrel. Generations of the same family have been known to compete across the years and it is thought that the event may have originated as a means of warding off evil spirits, similar to other British fire festivals, around the time of Halloween. In recent years the event has been jeopardised by the need for increasing public liability insurance coverage. Nevertheless, the event continues and the town of 7,000 people increases to well over 10,000. During the event all roads in and out of Ottery are closed for safety reasons with diversions in place.

On 30 October 2008 the annual event was threatened by a severe hailstorm, which hit East Devon shortly after midnight, with the Fire Service describing the situation in the Ottery St Mary area as "absolute chaos". The storm led to serious flooding in the town, caused mainly by storm drains becoming clogged with hailstones. Roads became blocked and the Coastguard service was required to airlift some people to safety. The flooding also caused problems on the Millennium Green, where the annual bonfire and fairground were being constructed in preparation for 5 November celebrations. One of the owners of the fairground said that the builders working there were "lucky to be alive". The clear-up operation was entirely successful, however, and both the carnival procession and the Tar Barrels and bonfire night celebrations went ahead as planned.

In 2009, the Factory Barrel was sabotaged by a visitor who threw an aerosol can into the barrel. The can exploded in the heat and 12 spectators required treatment for burns. In an unrelated incident, the roof of the old fire station burned down on the night of the 2009 tar barrels.

In 2020, the tar barrel event was cancelled as a result of the COVID-19 pandemic, however in recent years it has recommenced.

=== Pixie Day ===
Pixie Day is an old tradition which takes place annually in June. The day commemorates a legend of pixies being banished from the town to local caves known as the 'Pixie's Parlour'.

The Pixie Day legend originates from the early days of Christianity, when a local bishop decided to build a church in Otteri (Ottery St. Mary), and commissioned a set of bells to come from Wales, and to be escorted by monks on their journey.

On hearing of this, the pixies were worried, as they knew that once the bells were installed it would be the death knell of their rule over the land. So they cast a spell over the monks to redirect them from the road to Otteri to the road leading them to the cliff's edge at Sidmouth. Just as the monks were about to fall over the cliff, one of the monks stubbed his toe on a rock and said "God bless my soul" and the spell was said to be broken.

The bells were then brought to Otteri and installed. However, the pixies' spell was not completely broken; each year on a day in June the 'pixies' come out and capture the town's bell ringers and imprison them in Pixies' Parlour to be rescued by the Vicar of Ottery St Mary. This legend is re-enacted each year by the Cub and Brownie groups of Ottery St Mary, with a specially constructed Pixie's Parlour in the Town Square (the original Pixie's Parlour can be found along the banks of the River Otter).

=== Old Ottregians Society ===
An inhabitant of Ottery St Mary is known as an "Ottregian". One Sunday afternoon in 1898 six young men from Ottery, who were then living in London, met on the steps of St Paul's Cathedral, and resolved to form a Society to promote good fellowship among Ottery people wherever they may be. So was founded the Old Ottregians Society, which took as its motto Floreat Ottregia ("May Ottery Flourish"). The Old Ottregians society still exists (1997).

=== Old Ottery song ===
Another tradition in Ottery that continues today is the daily playing of the Old Ottery song. At eight o'clock, midday and four o'clock each day, the church of Ottery plays the Old Ottery song after the peal of the church bells. Tradition has it that the funerals of Old Ottregians always take place at 12.00 noon, with the funeral service commencing immediately following the playing of the Old Ottery song: The words are as follows ('kine' are cattle):

Sweet-breathing kine, / The old grey Church, / The curfew tolling slow, / The glory of the Western Sky, / The warm red earth below. // O! Ottery dear! O! Ottery fair! / My heart goes out to thee, / Thou art my home, wher'er I roam, / The West! The West for me!

=== John Coke's ghost ===
Within St Mary's Church, a colourful effigy of a soldier named John Coke can be found in a niche. He is said to have been murdered by a younger brother in 1632, and therefore tradition avers that his spirit steps down from the alcove and wanders about the church interior.

=== Media appearances ===
A season 3 episode of the BBC radio comedy series Cabin Pressure features Ottery St Mary.

Charlie Cooper's Myth Country, released by BBC Three on BBC iPlayer, visited Ottery St Mary in an episode on Winter Solstice that featured Tar Barrelling. The programme was an exploration of traditional British myths, legends and folk rituals. Cooper has said that it was inspired by his work on This Country.

== Disasters ==
=== Great fire ===
On 25 May 1866 a great fire occurred in Ottery. A newspaper report from the Exeter and Plymouth Gazette dated Friday, 1 June 1866, is summarized by historian J. Harris as follows:

The fire started about noon and the raged through the homes and shops of about a quarter of the town, reducing everything to ashes. The fire started on Jesu Street where the charity schools formerly stood. At first some people believed that the fire had been started by children playing with matches, but subsequent investigation has now proved this to be incorrect. It appears that the fire was started by a woman burning rubbish and papers in her cottage fireplace on Thursday. The fire smouldered and eventually burned through the wall to the school next door. It was eventually discovered at the top of the staircase in the schoolroom, near the cottage chimney around noon on Friday. It then spread very rapidly. Within hours one hundred houses had been destroyed, and 500 people rendered homeless – 10% of the population. A great part of the town extending westwards from the school to the silk factory in Mill Street was reduced to a heap of smouldering ruins.

=== Air crash ===
One evening in July 1980, a disaster was narrowly averted when an aircraft on approach to Exeter Airport crash-landed on the outskirts of town, in a field immediately south of the Salston Hotel. The aircraft, an Alidair Vickers Viscount turboprop, flying 62 passengers from Santander in Spain to Exeter was 11 miles short of the runway over a wooded area on East Hill, just before the town, when it ran out of fuel and all four engines stopped.

The pilot, who knew the area, was able to bank left and glide over the town's southern edge and make a wheels-up crash-landing in a field. The aircraft was put down at 19.53 hours, in daylight, near St Saviours' Bridge, in a small grassy valley studded with trees. The 27-year-old aircraft was written off in the crash. The only casualties were two sheep.

The Air Accidents Investigation Branch concluded that the accident had been primarily caused by the crew's mistaken belief that there was sufficient fuel on board to complete the flight. The aircraft's unreliable fuel gauges, the company's pilots' method of establishing total fuel quantity, and the imprecise company instructions regarding the use of dipsticks were also considered to be major contributory factors. Meter indications on the refuelling vehicle at Santander, which could not have accurately reflected the quantity of fuel delivered, were also considered to have been a probable contributory factor.

The accident investigation report concluded, however, that the aircraft commander's handling of the emergency once the aircraft's four engines stopped had been skilful and assured. Had he not acted in the way he did, there could have been a considerable loss of life of both aircraft passengers and residents of the town. One of the propellers from the aircraft was later donated by the airline to the town to be auctioned for charity.

The town still lies under the flightpath for Exeter International Airport.

== Historic estates ==
There are several historic estates within the parish of Ottery, including:

- Cadhay
- Thorne
- Knightstone

== Notable people ==
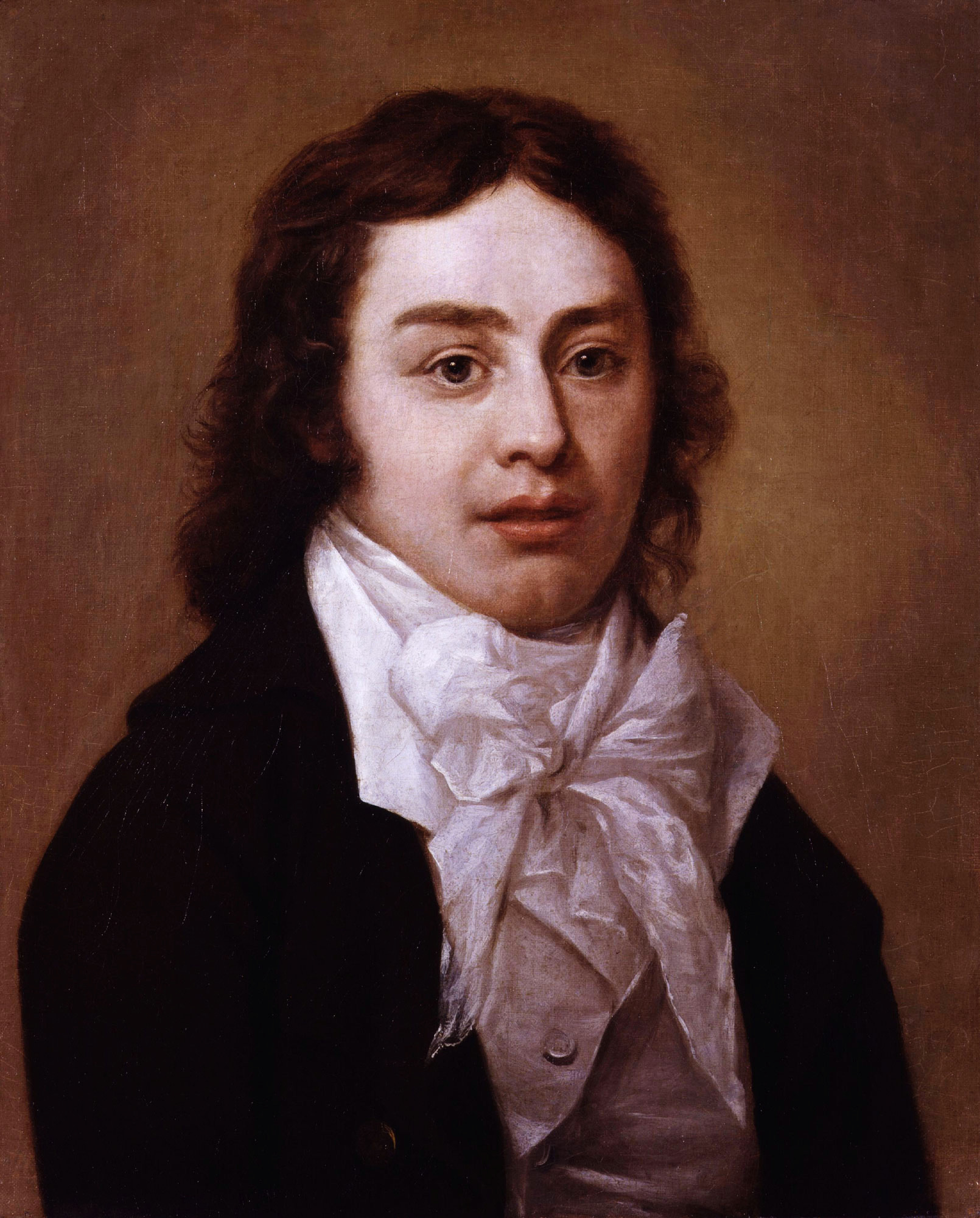
Samuel Taylor Coleridge, 1795

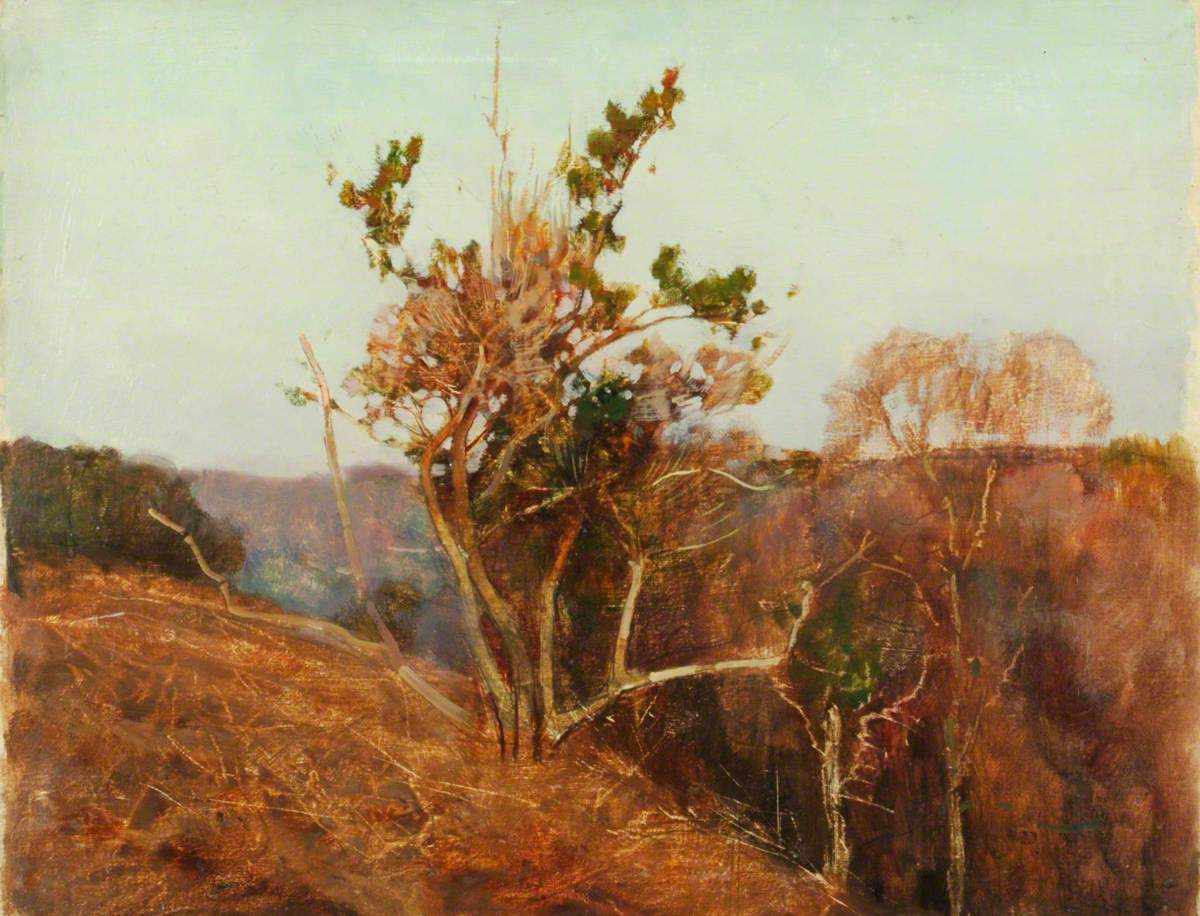
East Hill, Ottery St Mary by Benjamin Haughton

- John Newte (1656–1716), high Anglican clergyman, he defended the lawfulness of church music.
- Sir Isaac Heard (1730–1822), an officer of arms who served as Garter Principal King of Arms.
- Samuel Taylor Coleridge (1772–1834), the Romantic poet, His father, the Reverend John Coleridge, was a vicar; the family lived at The Chanter's House when John Coleridge was headmaster of the King's School.
- Edward Davy (1806–1885), English physician, scientist, and inventor of an electric relay.
- Henry James Coleridge (1822-1893), writer on religious affairs, preacher and editor of The Month for over fifteen years.
- Arthur Coleridge (1830–1913), lawyer and amateur musician, he founded The Bach Choir
- Sir Ernest Mason Satow (1843–1929), diplomat, scholar and Japanologist, retired to Beaumont House which still stands, buried locally with a commemorative plaque.
- Benjamin Haughton (1865–1924) landscape artist, lived locally
- André Laguerre (1915–1979), journalist and magazine editor of Sports Illustrated, 1960 to 1974
- Alwyn Robbins (1920–2002), a geodesist, and a founding fellow of St Cross College, Oxford

=== Sport ===
- Frederick Coleridge (1826–1906), cricketer and clergyman
- Hugh Whitby (1864–1934), cricketer and schoolmaster, played 29 First-class cricket matches
- Dick Ebdon (1913–1987), football forward who played 139 games for Exeter City
- Stuart Hogg (born 1992), Scottish rugby union captain, has played about 200 top games and 100 for Scotland

== Sport and leisure ==
The Non-League football club, Ottery St Mary A.F.C. plays at Washbrook Meadows.

The Colin Tooze Sports Centre is located opposite the King's School and the Move Forward Gym is located in Finnimore Trading Estate.

From 1968 to 1974, Ottery had a folk club that met regularly every week in the town's London Inn with singers such as Cyril Tawney and other local artists appearing, as well a number of local singers. The club was listed in the EFDSS list of local rural folk clubs.

== Railway ==
Until 1967 the town was served by Ottery St Mary railway station, which was closed under the Beeching Axe. The line ran from Sidmouth Junction (renamed as Feniton in 1971) on the main line from Exeter to Waterloo to the north of Ottery, and to Sidmouth and Exmouth to the south. The line split just south of Tipton St John, near the Bowd Inn. Both routes closed in March 1967. For many years the path of the railway, with the rails removed, remained in place, with evidence of the railway gates at places such as north of Cadhay Bridge. The closest railway station to Ottery St Mary is now at Feniton, approximately 3 miles away.

== Twin towns ==
- Pont-l'Évêque, France (Since 1977)
- Ilsfeld, Germany (Since 2003)

== Sources ==
- Whitham, J. (1984). Ottery St Mary. Camelot Press. ISBN 0-85033-526-4.
