= Coleridge (surname) =

Coleridge is a surname. Notable people with the surname include:

- Amy Coleridge (1864–1951), British actress
- Arthur Coleridge (1830–1913), British lawyer, cricketer and musician
- Bernard Coleridge, 2nd Baron Coleridge (1851–1927), British politician, son of John Duke Coleridge
- Charles Coleridge (1827–1875), English cricketer who played for Hampshire
- Christabel Rose Coleridge (1843–1921), English novelist
- David Coleridge (1932–2020), British insurance underwriter
- Derwent Coleridge (1800–1883), British scholar and teacher, son of Samuel Taylor Coleridge
- Ernest Hartley Coleridge (1846–1920), British literary scholar, son of Derwent Coleridge
- Ethel Coleridge (1883–1976), English actress
- Geoffrey Coleridge, 3rd Baron Coleridge (1877–1955), Justice of Peace for Devon
- Georgina Coleridge (1916–2003), Scottish journalist, magazine editor and publishing executive
- Hartley Coleridge (1796–1849), British writer, son of Samuel Taylor Coleridge
- Henry James Coleridge (1822–1893), English writer on religious affairs and preacher
- Henry Nelson Coleridge (1798–1843), British lawyer, nephew and son-in-law of Samuel Taylor Coleridge
- Herbert Coleridge (1830–1861), British philologist and lexicographer, son of Sara Coleridge and Henry Nelson Coleridge
- James Coleridge (1759–1836), ship's captain and elder brother of Samuel Taylor Coleridge
- John Coleridge (Indian Army officer) (1878–1951), British army officer
- John Coleridge, 1st Baron Coleridge (1820–1894), British lawyer and politician, son of John Taylor Coleridge
- John Taylor Coleridge (1790–1876), British judge, nephew of Samuel Taylor Coleridge
- Mark Coleridge (born 1948), an Australian Roman Catholic archbishop
- Mary Elizabeth Coleridge (1861–1907), British poet (related to Samuel Taylor Coleridge but not a direct descendant)
- Nicholas Coleridge (born 1957), British media executive, museum patron, and Provost of Eton College since 2023
- Sir Paul Coleridge (born 1949), retired judge of the High Court of England and Wales
- Richard Coleridge, 4th Baron Coleridge (1905–1984), naval officer
- Samuel Coleridge-Taylor (1875–1912), British composer
- Samuel Taylor Coleridge (1772–1834), British poet and critic
- Sara Coleridge (1802–1852), British writer, daughter of Samuel Taylor Coleridge, and wife of her cousin Henry Nelson Coleridge
- Stephen Coleridge (1854–1936), English author
- Sylvia Coleridge (1909–1986), British actress
- William Coleridge (1789–1849), Bishop of Barbados
- William Coleridge, 5th Baron Coleridge (born 1937), British hereditary peer

== See also ==
- Template:Coleridge family tree showing relationship between many of the above
- Baron Coleridge of Ottery St Mary in the County of Devon, a title in the Peerage of the United Kingdom
- Coleridge-Taylor Perkinson (1932–2004), American composer named after Samuel Coleridge-Taylor
