= Coleridge (disambiguation) =

Samuel Taylor Coleridge (1772–1834) was an English poet, literary critic, philosopher and theologian.

Coleridge may also refer to:

== Places ==
- Coleridge, an electoral ward of Cambridge, England
- Coleridge, Nebraska, U.S.
- Coleridge, North Carolina, U.S.
- Lake Coleridge, Canterbury, New Zealand
- Coleridge Hundred, an ancient subdivision of Devon, England
- Coleridge (New Zealand electorate), a former parliamentary electorate
- Coleridge (crater), a crater on planet Mercury
- Coldridge, Devon, England

== Other uses ==
- Coleridge (surname), a list of people with the surname Coleridge
- Baron Coleridge of Ottery St Mary in the County of Devon, a title in the Peerage of the United Kingdom
- Coleridge Community College, Cambridge, England
- SS Empire Coleridge, a tanker ship

== See also ==
- Coleridge-Taylor (disambiguation)
