= John Coleridge =

John Coleridge may refer to:

- John Coleridge, 1st Baron Coleridge (1820–1894), British lawyer, judge and Liberal politician
- John Coleridge (Indian Army officer) (1878–1951)
- John Taylor Coleridge (1790–1876), English judge
- J. D. Coleridge (1879–1934), English architect
