= United Kingdom–United States relations in World War II =

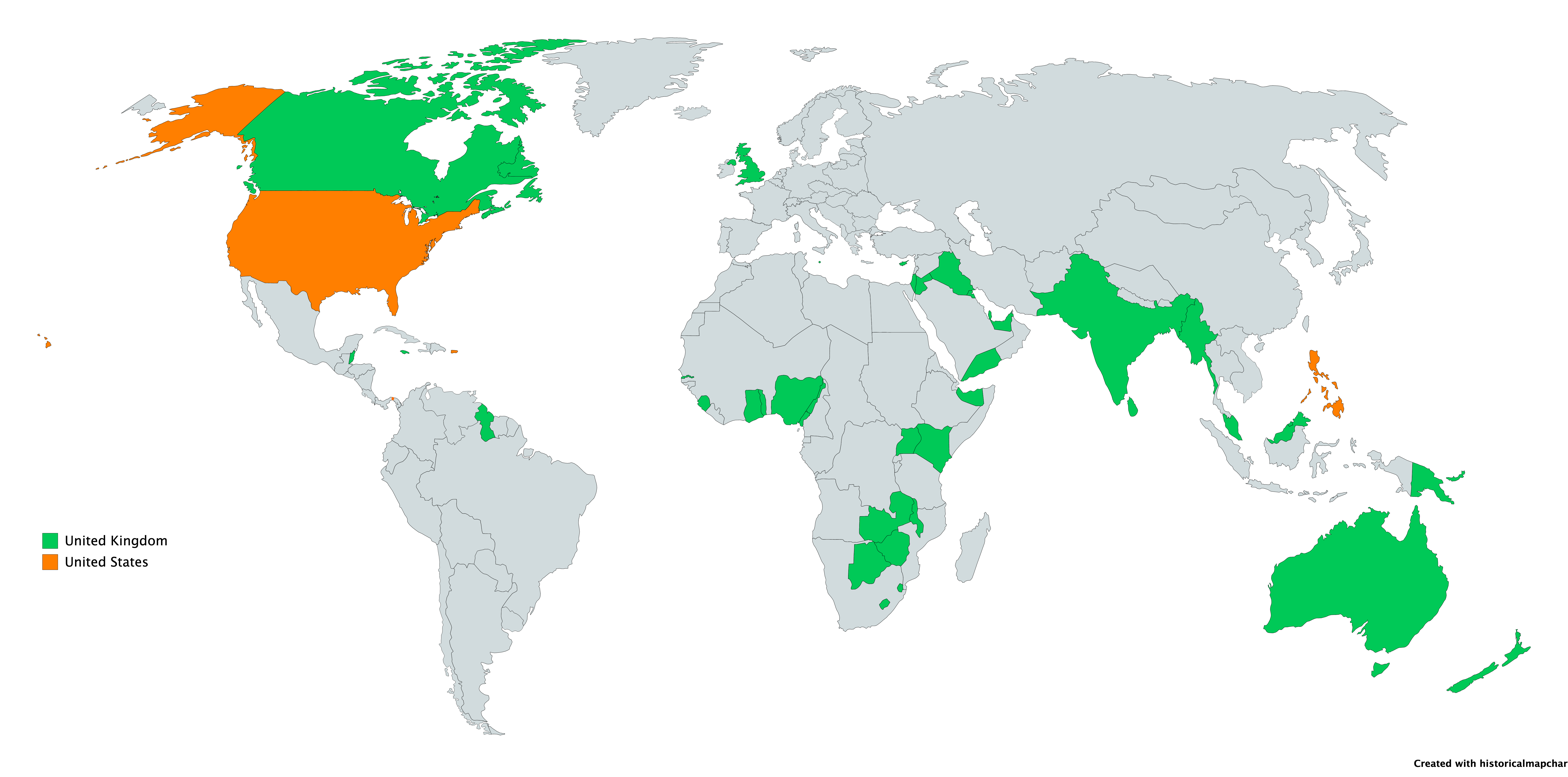

- United Kingdom: United States

The UK-US relations in World War II comprised an extensive and highly complex relationship, in terms of diplomacy, military action, financing, and supplies. British Prime Minister Winston Churchill and American President Franklin D. Roosevelt formed close personal ties, that operated apart from their respective diplomatic and military organizations against Hitler's Germany, Mussolini's Italy and Tojo's Japan.

== Leadership issues ==
While Franklin Roosevelt and Winston Churchill have thoroughly dominated the popular and scholarly writings, each stood atop a complex decision-making system that guaranteed inputs from military, diplomatic, business and public opinion.

In terms of foreign-policy, Roosevelt for years had developed a system whereby he made all the major decisions. Secretary of State, Cordell Hull was relegated to ceremonial roles. Secretary of the Treasury Henry Morgenthau Jr. had the loudest voice in financial matters, and was deeply engaged in foreign policy, especially regarding Lend Lease, China, Jews and Germany. Although Roosevelt himself was quite pragmatic about moral issues, the image he presented to outsiders, especially the British, grated on their sensibilities. British foreign minister Anthony Eden told his war cabinet, "Soviet policy is amoral; United States policy is exaggeratedly moral, at least where non-American interests are concerned."

In military affairs, the Joint Chiefs of Staff was headed by Admiral William D. Leahy, a close personal friend of the president for decades. It dealt directly with their British counterparts in a new organization, the Combined Chiefs of Staff, which was based in Washington. Military decisions were made through the joint Chiefs and the combined chiefs, and they issued the orders to the theatre chiefs. The chiefs were in command of all Allied forces in their geographical zone. This was a new concept in military history, one promoted by General Marshall and accepted reluctantly at first by the British. In terms of British-American military teamwork, the key theaters were the Mediterranean and the West European – SHAEF. US general Dwight D. Eisenhower Headed the Mediterranean Theater 1943–44, then moved to SHAEF.

Historians have always paid special attention to the Roosevelt-Churchill friendship. They also have explored how the two men dealt with Joseph Stalin, the Soviet dictator. Roosevelt and Churchill met in person 11 times. They exchanged 1700 cables and letters and they even made some international phone calls. Roosevelt also sent top aides, especially Harry Hopkins and to a lesser extent W. Averell Harriman. Harriman accompanied Churchill to the Moscow Conference in 1942 to explain to Stalin why the western allies were carrying out operations in North Africa instead of opening the promised second front in France. Harriman was appointed as Ambassador to the USSR in 1943.

Churchill ran a coalition government, with all parties represented. He dominated his War Cabinet. Clement Attlee, the leader of the Labour party, was Deputy Prime Minister and handled practically all domestic affairs. He did so very quietly, usually backstage. Churchill, like Roosevelt, relied on charisma and a very strong public image, to rally public opinion. Churchill handled all the top foreign policy decisions himself, with his Foreign Minister Anthony Eden taking charge only of lower visibility issues. Churchill made himself Minister of Defence and repeatedly interfered and reshaped and argued with his chiefs of staff. Historians generally agree with the quality of Churchill's wartime leadership, often emphasizing his remarkable success in obtaining American support. Richard Wilkinson, who is more critical than most historians, nevertheless argues:

No one else in Britain could have approached Churchill's achievement in winning the support of President Roosevelt and his fellow citizens....He displayed a profound and sincere admiration for America. His courtship of Roosevelt was a marvellous mixture of flattery, bonhomie, and the reiteration of those values which the USA and Great Britain shared and therefore of the threat which Nazism posed to both democracies. Churchill appealed to America's interests and to her sentiments.

The British sent two ambassadors to Washington; each achieved very positive reputations for handling American leaders and influencing American public opinion. Lord Lothian served in 1930–40. On his death Lord Halifax took charge, 1940–46. Halifax as Foreign Minister (1938–40) had been a leader of the appeasement movement before 1939, but then reversed himself and took an aggressive anti-Hitler position. The US Ambassador 1938–40 Joseph P. Kennedy was a defeatist who in 1940 warned Roosevelt that Britain was doomed. Roosevelt could not remove Kennedy because he needed Irish support in the major cities in the 1940 election, Kennedy endorsed Roosevelt then retired, to be replaced by low-key Republican John Winant, who did well in London, 1941–46.

After the declarations of war, foreign-policy issues were no longer high on the political agenda. Appeasement was dead in Britain; isolationism was dead in the United States. After the U.S. entered the war in December 1941, foreign-policy was rarely discussed by Congress, and there was very little demand to cut Lend Lease spending. In spring 1944, the House passed a bill to renew the Lend Lease program by a vote of 334 to 21. The Senate passed it by a vote of 63 to 1.

== Top level conferences ==
=== Atlantic Charter 1941 ===
Roosevelt and Churchill met secretly at Placentia Bay in Newfoundland in August 1941, and issued a policy statement that became the foundation document for the Allies who later joined the war against Germany. A country had to join to gain admission to the United Nations. The Atlantic Charter defined the Allied goals for the post world war. The Charter stated the ideal goals of the war—no territorial aggrandizement; no territorial changes made against the wishes of the people, self-determination; restoration of self-government to those deprived of it; reduction of trade restrictions; global cooperation to secure better economic and social conditions for all; freedom from fear and want; freedom of the seas; and abandonment of the use of force, as well as disarmament of aggressor nations. Adherents of the Atlantic Charter signed the Declaration by United Nations on 1 January 1942, which became the basis for the modern United Nations. The Charter was a powerful propaganda weapon, but Churchill, profoundly committed to maintaining British Empire, claimed it did not apply to British possessions. Churchill's insistence on full control was signaled when he did not bring along his foreign minister Anthony Eden.

=== Arcadia, 1941–1942 ===
The Arcadia Conference was held in Washington, from December 22, 1941 to January 14, 1942, bringing together the top British and American military leaders. Churchill and Roosevelt and their aides had very candid conversations that led to a series of major decisions that shaped the war effort in 1942–1943. The decision was made to invade North Africa in 1942, to send American bombers to bases in England, and for the British to strengthen their forces in the Pacific. The Conference established the Combined Chiefs of Staff, headquartered in Washington, which approved and finalized all military decisions. It also created a unified American-British-Dutch-Australian Command (ABDA) in the Far East; it fared poorly. Finally the conference drafted the Declaration by United Nations, which committed the Allies to make no separate peace with the enemy, and to employ full resources until victory.

=== Quebec Conference, 1943 ===
At the Quebec Conference, 1943 held in Canada in August 1943, Churchill, Roosevelt and the Combined Chiefs plotted strategy against Germany. They began planning the invasion of France, codenamed Overlord using a report by the Combined Chiefs. They also discussed an increase of the bombing offensive against facilities Germany was using in France and the Low Countries. They decided to continue the buildup of American forces in Britain prior to an invasion of France. Churchill kept drawing attention to the advantages of operations in the Mediterranean theatre. They agreed to use more force to force Italy out of the war, and to occupy it along with Corsica. Military cooperation was close and successful. The Prime Minister of Canada was the host, but no Canadians attended the secret meetings.

=== Casablanca Conference 1943 ===
From January 14–24, 1943 Roosevelt, Churchill and the Combined Staff met in Casablanca, Morocco. They decided on the major Allied strategy for 1943 in Europe, especially the invasion of Italy and planning for the invasion of France. They blended British and American offensive concepts. At Roosevelt's demand, they agreed on a policy of "unconditional surrender." This policy uplifted Allied morale, but it also made the Nazis resolve to fight to the bitter end. A major problem was to establish a working relationship between the two main French allies, Henri Giraud, the French high commissioner in North Africa, and General Charles de Gaulle, leader of the Free French. Roosevelt strongly disliked de Gaulle, while Churchill championed him. The final decision was to split control of liberated French areas between the two Frenchmen. By 1944, de Gaulle prevailed, but he never forgave Roosevelt and always distrusted Anglo-American collaboration as hostile to French interests.

== Lend-Lease ==
The Americans spent about $50 billion on Lend Lease aid to the British Empire, the Soviet Union, France, China, and some smaller countries. That amounted to about 11% of the cost of the war to the U.S.. It received back about $7.8 billion in goods and services provided by the recipients to the United States, especially the cost of rent for American installations abroad. Lend Lease aid was usually not dollars that the recipient could use for any purpose. Instead it was supplies and services counted by the dollar value of military and naval munitions as well as civilian supplies such as freighters, oil, food, chemicals, metals, machinery, rent and shipping services. The total given to the British Empire, 1940-45 was $30.0 billion. This includes supplies to India, Australia, and the other dominions and colonies. Russia received $10.7 billion, and all other countries $2.9 billion. The question of repayment came up, and Roosevelt repeatedly insisted the United States did not want a postwar debt problem of the sort that had troubled relations after the first world war. A small fraction of goods that were still useful – such as merchant ships – were returned to the United States. The recipients provided bases and supplies to American forces on their own soil. The cost, including rents, was called "Reverse Lend Lease", that is, aid given to the United States. It came to $7.8 billion overall, of which 86% came from the British Empire. Canada operated a similar program on behalf of Great Britain, and Britain itself operated a similar one for the Soviet Union. In terms of repaying Washington after the war ended, the policy became one of fair shares. In the end, no one paid for the goods it received, although they did pay for goods in transit that were received after the program ended. Roosevelt told Congress in June 1942:

The real costs of the war cannot be measured, nor compared, nor paid for in money. They must and are being met in blood and toil.... If each country devotes roughly the same fraction of its national production to the war, then the financial burden of war is distributed equally among the United Nations in accordance with their ability to pay.

== Military cooperation ==
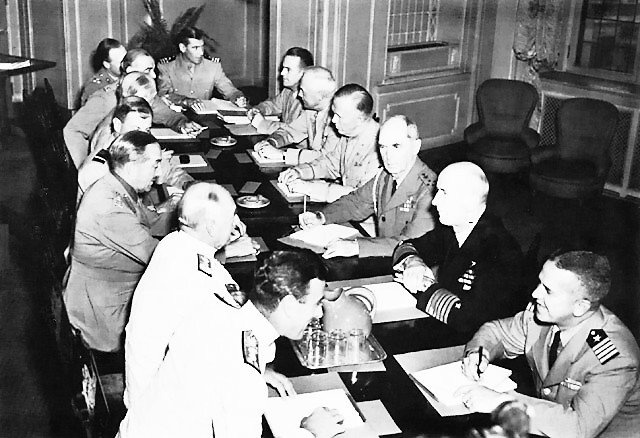
Combined Chiefs of Staff in Quebec – August 23, 1943. Seated around the table from left foreground: Vice Adm. Lord Louis Mountbatten, Sir Dudley Pound, Sir Alan Brooke, Sir Charles Portal, Sir John Dill, Lt. Gen. Sir Hastings L. Ismay, Brigadier Harold Redman, Comdr. R.D. Coleridge, Brig. Gen. John R. Deane, General Henry Arnold, General George Marshall, Admiral William D. Leahy, Admiral Ernest King, and Capt. F.B. Royal.

The Combined Chiefs of Staff (CCS) was the supreme military staff for the United States and Great Britain during World War II. It set all the major policy decisions for the two nations, subject to the approvals of Prime Minister Winston Churchill and President Franklin D Roosevelt. It controlled forces from all the Allied nations in all theaters, including the Pacific, India and North Africa. Representatives of allied nations were not members of the CCS. Instead the usual procedure included consultation with "Military Representatives of Associated Powers" on strategic issues.

=== Technical collaboration ===
Technical collaboration was close. Catalyzed by the Tizard Mission, the two nations shared secrets and weapons regarding the proximity fuze and radar, as well as airplane engines, Nazi codes, and the atomic bomb.

== India ==
Serious tension erupted over American support for independence for India, a proposition Churchill vehemently rejected. For years Roosevelt had encouraged Britain's disengagement from India. The American position was based on principled opposition to colonialism despite its own colonies in The Philippines, Hawaii and Puerto Rico. The politically active Indian population was deeply divided. One element was so insistent on the expulsion of the British, that it sided with Germany and Japan, and formed the Indian National Army (INA) from Indian prisoners of war. It fought as part of the Japanese invasion of Burma and eastern India. There was a large pacifist element, which rallied to Gandhi's call for abstention from the war; he said that violence in every form was evil. There was a high level of religious tension between the Hindu majority and the Muslims minority. For the first time the Muslim community became politically active, giving strong support for the British war effort. Over 2 million Indians volunteered for military service, including a large Muslim contingent. The British were sensitive to demands of the Muslim League, led by Muhammad Ali Jinnah, since it needed Muslim soldiers in India and Muslim support all across the Middle East. London used the religious tensions in India as a justification to continue its rule, saying it was needed to prevent religious massacres of the sort that would happen in 1947. The imperialist element in Britain was strongly represented in the Conservative party; Churchill himself had long been its leading spokesman.

On the other hand, Attlee and the Labour Party favoured independence and had close ties to the Congress Party. The British cabinet sent Sir Stafford Cripps to India with a specific peace plan offering India the promise of dominion status after the war. Congress demanded independence immediately and the Cripps mission failed. Roosevelt gave support to Congress, sending his representative Louis Johnson to help negotiate some sort of independence. Churchill was outraged, refused to cooperate with Roosevelt on the issue, and threatened to resign as prime minister if Roosevelt pushed too hard. Roosevelt pulled back. In 1942 when the Congress Party launched a Quit India Movement of nonviolent civil disobedience, the Raj police immediately arrested tens of thousands of activists (including Gandhi), holding them for the duration. Meanwhile, wartime disruptions caused severe food shortages in eastern India; hundreds of thousands died of starvation. To this day a large Indian element blames Churchill for the Bengal famine of 1943. In terms of the war effort, India became a major base for American supplies sent to India, and Lend Lease operations boosted the local economy. The 2 million Indian soldiers were a major factor in British success in the Middle East. Muslim support for the British war effort proved decisive in the British decision to partition the Raj, forming of the new state of Pakistan.

== See also ==
- Allied technological cooperation during World War II
- British Army during the Second World War
- British Empire in World War II
- Destroyers for Bases Agreement
- Diplomatic history of World War II
- History of the Royal Air Force
- History of the Royal Navy
- Lend-Lease
- Military production during World War II
- Timeline of British diplomatic history
- Timeline of United States diplomatic history
- United Kingdom–United States relations
