= J. D. Coleridge =

English architect (1879–1934)

John Duke Coleridge
- Born: 10 November 1879
- Died: 9 September 1934 (aged 54)
- Occupations: Architect and naval officer
- Parent(s): Stephen Coleridge; Geraldine Lushington

John Duke Coleridge FRIBA (10 November 1879 – 9 September 1934) was an English architect and landscape gardener, working as J. D. Coleridge.

== Early life ==
Born on 10 November 1879, Coleridge was the eldest son of Stephen William Buchanan Coleridge and his wife Geraldine Beatrice Lushington. He was a grandson of another John Duke Coleridge, who became Lord Chief Justice, and of his wife Jane Fortescue Seymour, an artist. His father was a barrister, author, and landscape artist. His grandfather was a nephew of the poet Samuel Taylor Coleridge.

He was articled to Walter Cave to train as an architect. He was also a pupil of the Arts and Crafts architect Edwin Lutyens and is reported to have been his closest pupil.

== Career ==
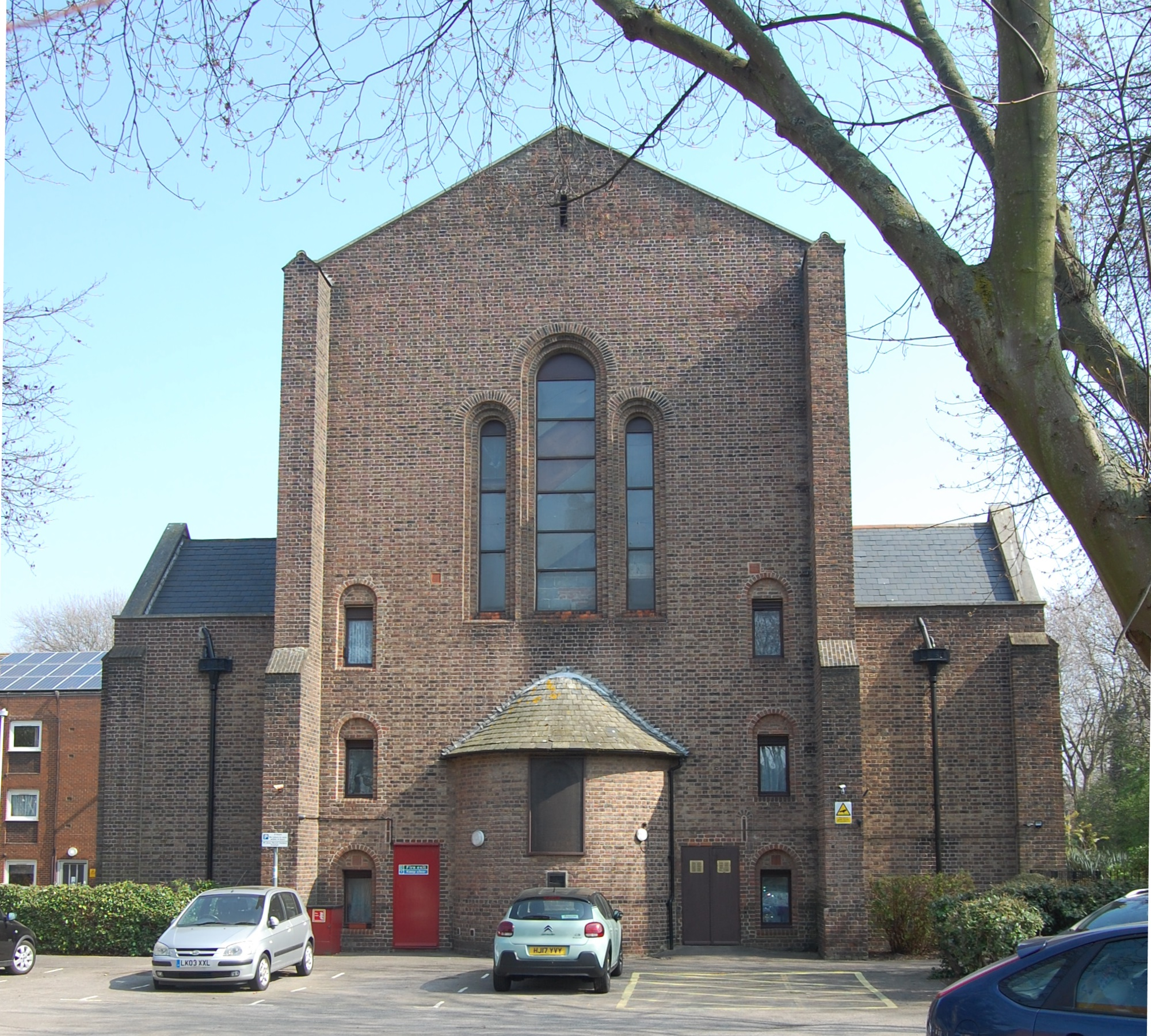
Former church of St John the Baptist, Rudmore, Portsmouth (1915), designed by Coleridge

Coleridge began his career as an assistant to Lutyens for some years, going on to become an architect and landscape gardener in his own right. His style reflects the Vernacular Revival and Arts and Crafts principles of Lutyens, favouring local stone and traditional timber-framing. He was the brother of another architect, Paul Humphrey Coleridge, and they worked together in the firm of Coleridge, Jennings, and Soimenow, in which the other partners were Frank Jenning and Mitrofan Soimenow (1892–1976).

An early commission was to design a new English country house at Hascombe Court, which Nikolaus Pevsner praised for Coleridge's "fine Bargate stone entrance front in his master's manner".

During the First World War, from 1915 to 1918 Coleridge served in the Royal Naval Volunteer Reserve, gaining the rank of Lieutenant.

Coleridge was elected a Fellow of the Royal Institute of British Architects.

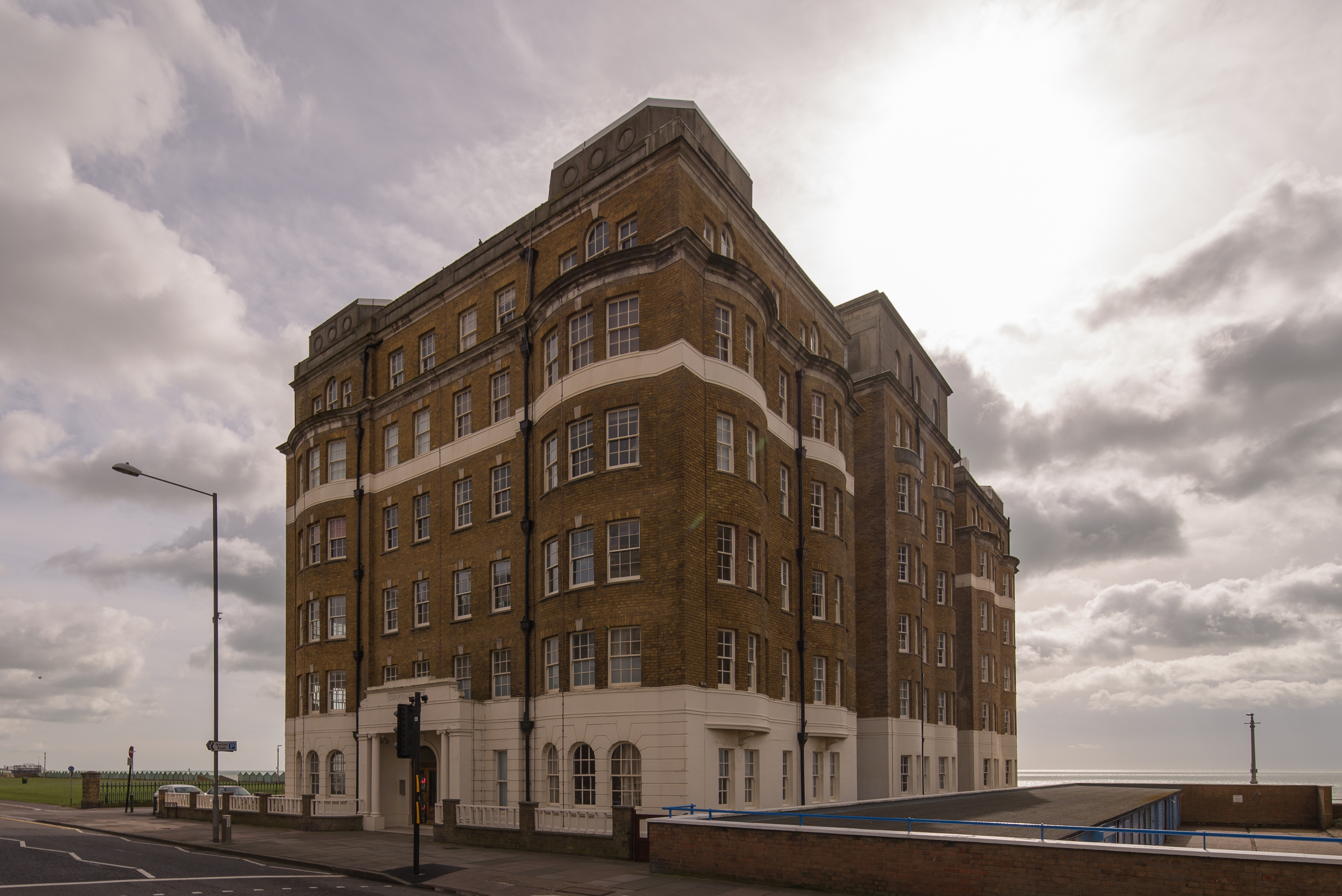
Courtenay Gate, a block of flats in Hove, completed 1934

== Personal life ==
On 11 June 1904, at Holy Trinity Sloane Street, Chelsea, Coleridge was married to Katharine Euphemia Godley, the second daughter of Sir Arthur Godley, by William Jackson, Rector of Exeter College, Oxford. Both were aged 24. They had three children, Peter Duke Coleridge (1905–1958), Nancy Katharine Coleridge (1907–1989), and Arthur Nicholas Coleridge (1915–1988).

J. D. Coleridge died suddenly on 9 September 1934, aged 54, at the Royal Hotel, Hayling Island, while living at Darby Green House, Blackwater, and was survived by his wife and children.

In September 1941, while a junior officer in the Irish Guards, Arthur Nicholas Coleridge married Lady Georgina Hay, a daughter of William Hay, 11th Marquess of Tweeddale.
