= HYSapientia =

Chinese manufacturer of air fryers

- Type: Private
- Industry: Home appliances
- Founder: Jimmy Wang
- Headquarters: Cixi, Zhejiang, China
- Website: hysapientia.com

HYSapientia is a Chinese manufacturer of air fryers. It is based in Ningbo, Cixi, Zhejiang.

== History ==
HYSapientia was founded as a manufacturer of air fryers. HYSapientia is a compound of "HY" and "Sapientia." "HY" is phonetically pronounced as "Hi," while "Sapientia" is Latin for "Wisdom." It develops air fryers with a stainless steel exterior and a diamond-shaped interior.

== Air fryers ==
HYSapientia manufactures several air fryers, but the most well known among them is the HYSapientia 24L Air Fryer Oven. HYSapientia 24L Air Fryer Oven has been reviewed by multiple newspapers and magazines, including BBC Good Food, Derby Telegraph, GQ, Herald Scotland, Homes & Gardens, Liverpool Echo, Plymouth Herald, The Cornishman, TechRadar, Daily Mirror, and Yorkshire Evening Post.
