= Georgina Coleridge =

Scottish journalist (1916–2003)

- Born: Marguerite Georgina Christine Hay; 19 March 1916; East Lothian, Scotland, United Kingdom
- Died: 25 March 2003 (aged 87); United Kingdom
- Other name: Lady G
- Citizenship: United Kingdom
- Occupations: Journalist; Magazine editor; Publishing executive
- Years active: 1936–1984
- Spouse: Arthur Coleridge (m. 1941; died 1988)
- Children: 1
- Father: William Hay, 11th Marquess of Tweeddale

Marguerite Georgina Christine Coleridge (née Hay; 19 March 1916 – 25 March 2003) was a Scottish journalist, magazine editor and publishing executive. She began her journalistic career as a freelance contributor to Harper's Bazaar in 1936 before working for the National Magazine Company until the outbreak of the Second World War. Coleridge worked for Country Life and later Homes & Gardens as part of its editorial staff until 1963. She co-founded the Women of the Year Lunch in 1955 aiming to honour the achievements of women's success in arts, the professions and science in a "man's world". Coleridge was director of both Country Life Ltd and George Newnes Ltd as well as being IPC Women's Magazines's director of special projects from 1971 to 1974. She was the author of two books.

== Early life ==
On 19 March 1916, Coleridge was born Marguerite Georgina Christine Hay in East Lothian, Scotland. She was the second of four daughters born to William Hay, 11th Marquess of Tweeddale, and Marguerite Christine Ralli Einstein. Coleridge was educated at the family home known as Yester House, in Gifford, East Lothian, by a succession of governesses from France and Germany. When she was nine years old, she took up shooting with a mixture of results, and began compiling a series of verses alongside her own horse racing sketches, which was a privately printed survey of types of equine published under the name Grand Smashional Pointers.

== Career ==
At age 20 in 1936, Coleridge began a career in journalism, writing freelance as a contributor to Harper's Bazaar. The following year, she joined the circulation department of the National Magazine Company, before transferring to its advertising department. When the Second World War broke out in 1939, Coleridge moved back to Scotland and volunteered in a Naafi canteen. In 1945, she joined Country Life, and joined the editorial staff of Homes & Gardens in 1947 under the editorialship of Alice Head. Two years later, Coleridge was appointed Homes & Gardens's editor following the retirement of Head. She had the objective of making the magazine attractive to the "whole woman" unlike other publications seeking to assist women in bettering their environments. Coleridge was chair of the Institute of Journalists’ London district for 1954.

She spoke to George Cross recipient Odette Hallowes and Antonella Kerr, Marchioness of Lothian in 1955 and out of that came the idea of the formation of the Women of the Year Lunch aiming to honour the achievements of women's success in arts, the professions and science in a "man's world". The trio co-founded the charity lunch, which became something of an awards ceremony without the presentation of accolades. It promoted several hundred of women's successes selected from nomination and reference book lists and obtained a large amount of capital for the Greater London Fund for the Blind charity.

In 1959, Coleridge published her first book, I Know What I Like, featuring cliches and platitudes. She was appointed a director of Country Life's magazine owners Country Life Ltd in 1962 and stood down as Homes & Gardens's editor the following year. Coleridge went on to become a director of Country Life's future owners George Newnes Ltd from 1963 to 1969. Between 1965 and 1967, she served as president of the Women's Press Club. From 1971 until her retirement in 1974, Coleridge was made a director of special projects for IPC Women's Magazines. She was made freeman of the Worshipful Company of Stationers and Newspaper Makers in 1973.

Coleridge partly owned two race horses, with one of them, Islay Mist, winning on his third outing at Plumpton in 1973. Five years later, her memoirs about her experiences in horse racing, That's Racing: A Dream That Happened, was published. In 1982, after holding honorary positions of several professional bodies, Coleridge retired from magazine publishing.

== Personal life ==
In September 1941, Lady Georgina Hay married Arthur Nicholas Coleridge, a junior officer in the Irish Guards, the younger son of the architect J. D. Coleridge. Coleridge was a barrister and was Sir Norman Brook's secretary at the War Cabinet Office. He later worked for Reader's Digest. They had one daughter, Frances Marguerite Katharine Coleridge, born in 1943, and were together until Arthur Coleridge's death in 1988.

She preferred to be known as "Lady G" and played bridge.

Georgina Coleridge died on 25 March 2003.

== Legacy ==
Veronice Horwell of The Guardian wrote of Coleridge "few daughters of the nobility went as seriously into the business as did Lady Georgina Coleridge", and the correspondent for The Times noted she "established a formula of beauty, cookery and free supplements in the postwar years".
