= Chapel at College of St Mark and St John =

Chapel in London, England

Coordinates: 51.482058°N 0.186702°W

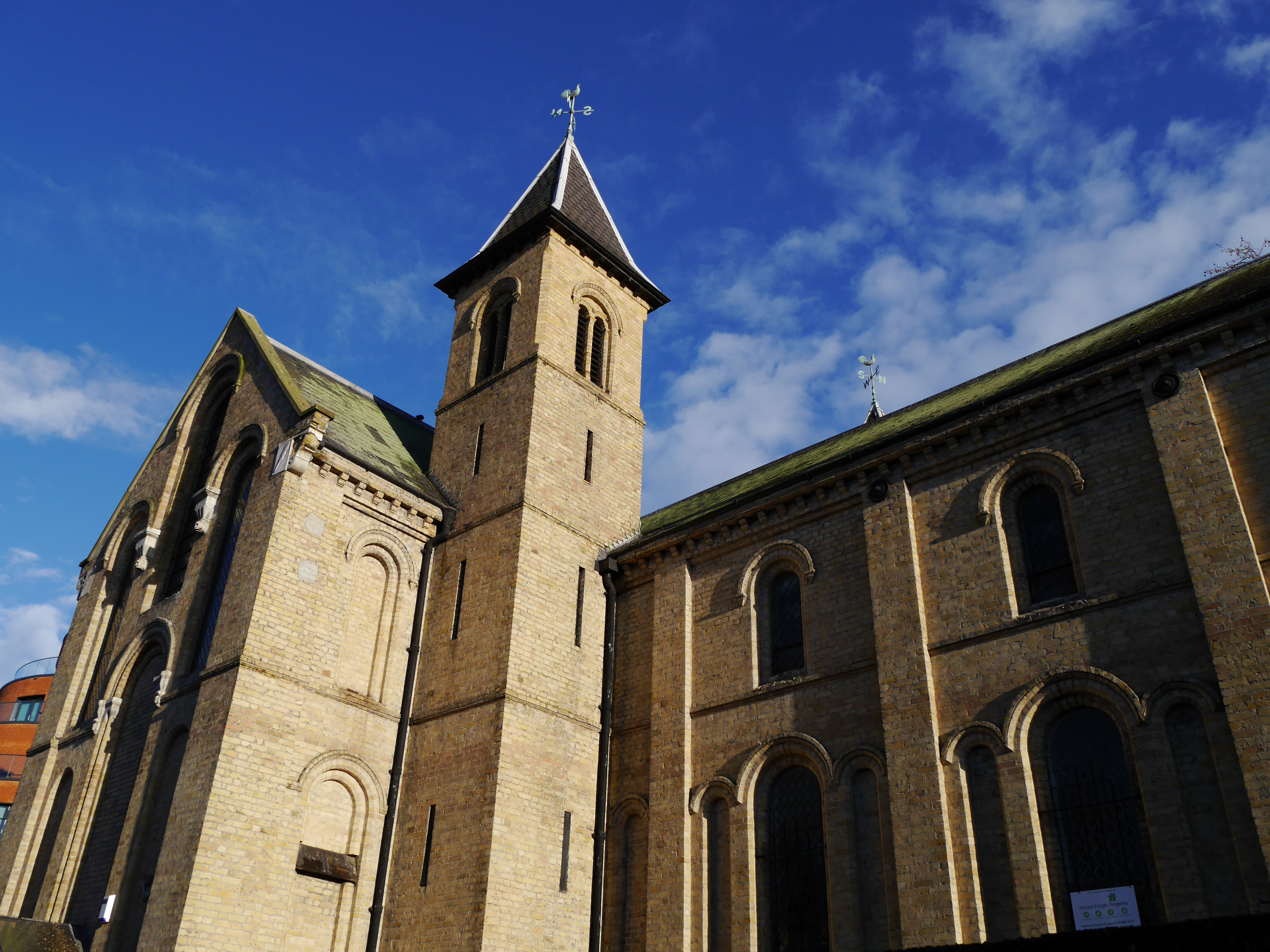
Chapel at College of St Mark and St John, Chelsea, London

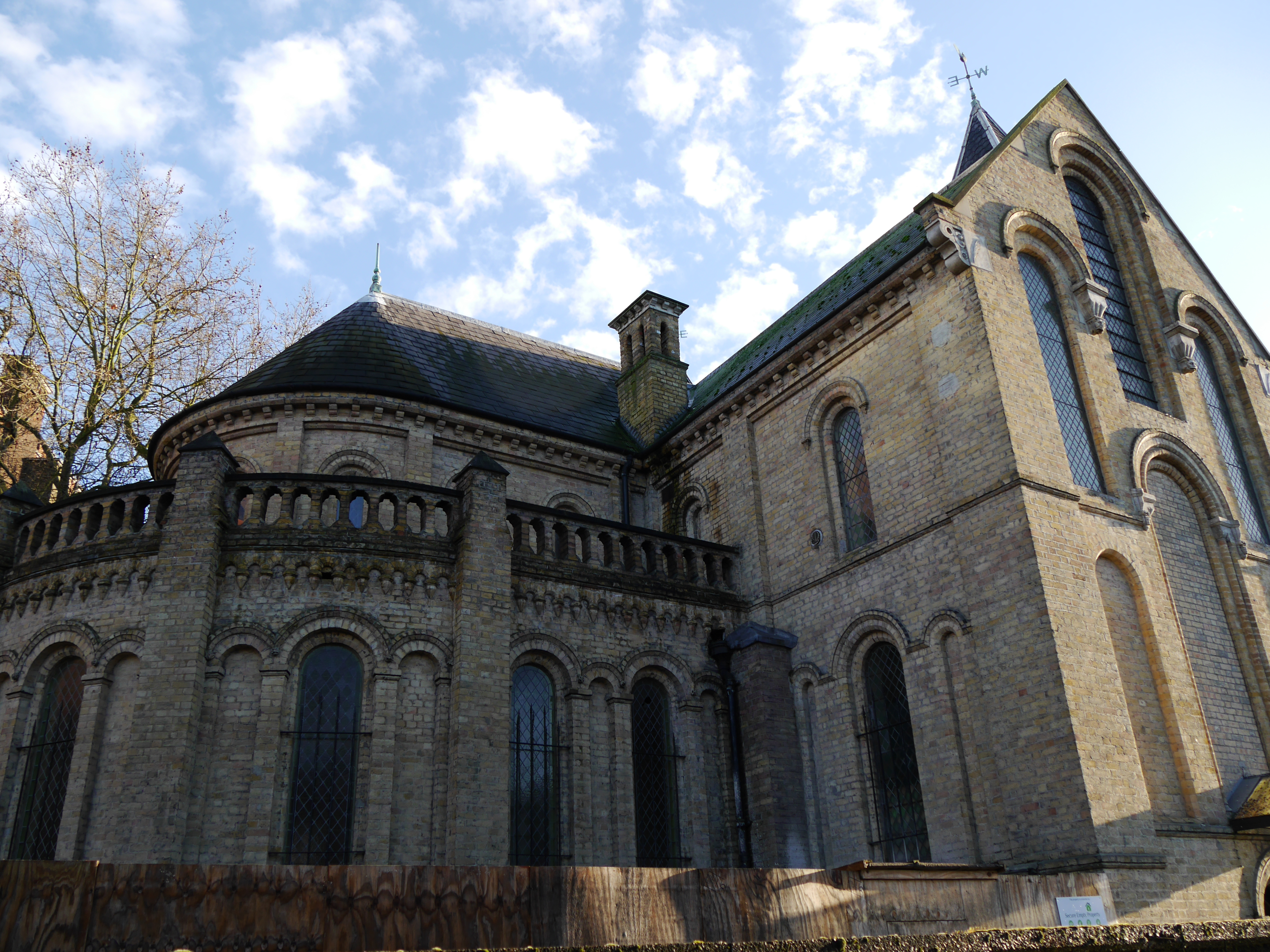
Chapel

The Chapel at the College of St Mark and St John is a Grade II listed building at 459a Fulham Road, Chelsea, London SW10 9UZ.

== History ==
It was built in 1841 by the architect Edward Blore who presented his designs, in various drafts, for approval by Rev. Derwent Coleridge, the first principal, as the chapel of St. Mark's College, Chelsea, established by the charity renamed the National Society for Promoting Religious Education. The college soon specialised in teaching of education, arts and other areas and later moved to Devon to become the University of St Mark & St John also known as Plymouth Marjon University.

== Conversion into two houses ==
As of 2017, the chapel is being redeveloped to create two houses, and has been renamed 1 and 2 The King's Chapel.
