= Walter Cave =

English architect (1863–1939)

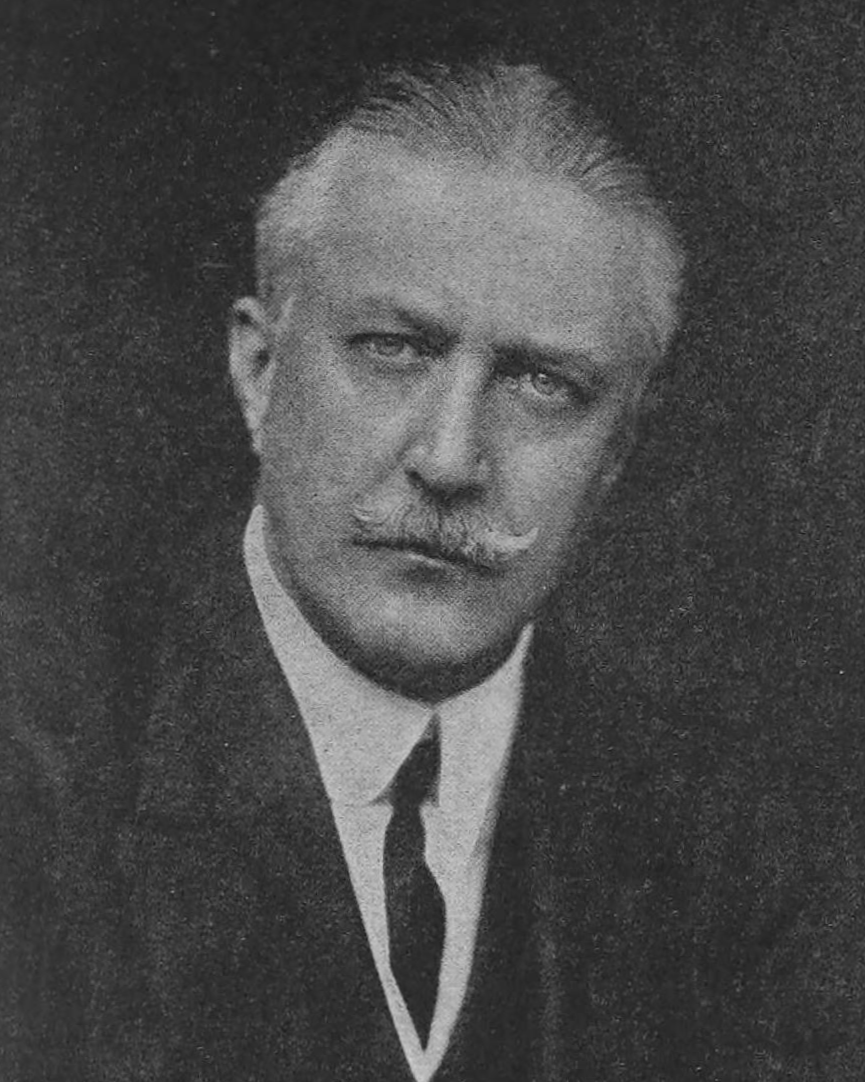
- Architect
- Born: 17 September 1863; Clifton, Bristol, England
- Died: 7 January 1939 (aged 75); London
- Education: Royal Academy Schools
- Occupation: Architect

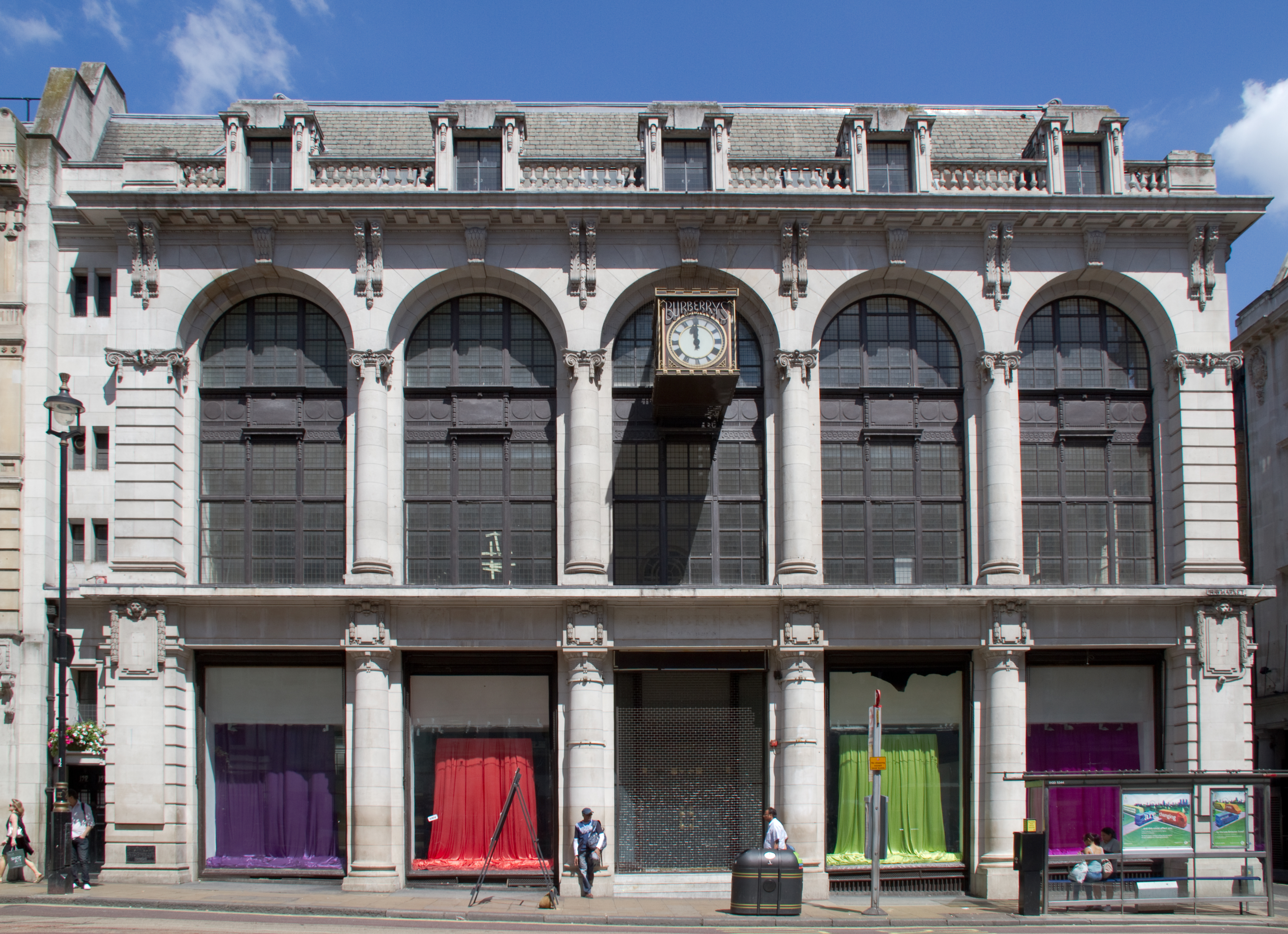
Burberry Building, Haymarket, London

Walter Frederick Cave (17 September 1863 – 7 January 1939) was an English architect, active in the later nineteenth and early twentieth centuries, who worked firstly in the Arts and Crafts style, and latterly in the Classical Revival. In addition to architecture, Cave worked as a landscape gardener, interior designer, furniture maker and cricketer.

== Biography ==
He was born in Clifton, Bristol, England the son of Sir Charles Daniel Cave, 1st Baronet and Edith Harriet Symonds. Educated at Eton, Cave went on to study art at the Royal Academy Schools. He was then articled to Arthur Blomfield. In 1889 he set up a practice in London and joined the Art Workers' Guild. His most notable building is the former headquarters of Burberry, The Haymarket, in London (opened 1913). He also worked for Somerville College, Oxford, and his articled pupils included J. D. Coleridge.

Cave was also a first-class cricketer, playing in four first-class matches in 1883, making one appearance for the South in the North v South fixture and three appearances for Gloucestershire. A right-handed batsman, he scored a total of 74 runs with a high score of 42.

== Personal life ==
In 1892, he married Jessie Maria Cochrane. They had one child, Richard Walter Dundonald Cave (1901–1980).
