= Geoffrey Coleridge, 3rd Baron Coleridge =

British family archivist

The Right Honourable The Lord Coleridge JP
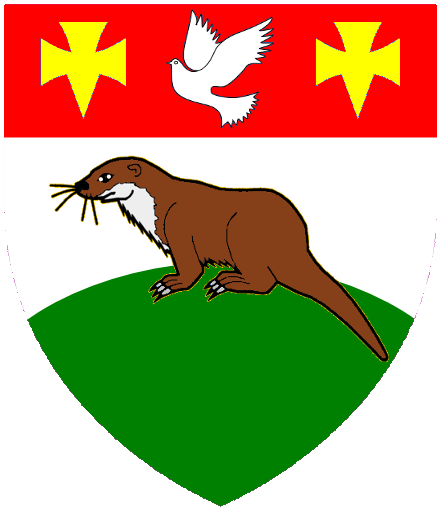
- Coat of arms
- Born: 23 July 1877
- Died: 27 March 1955 (aged 77)
- Spouse: Jessie Alethea Mackarness
- Children: 3
- Parent(s): Bernard Coleridge; Mary Alethea Mackarness

Geoffrey Duke Coleridge, 3rd Baron Coleridge (23 July 1877 – 27 March 1955) was a British aristocrat and military officer, who was responsible for making the archive of his family member the poet Samuel Taylor Coleridge available to researchers for the first time.

== Biography ==
The only son of Bernard Coleridge MP, and grandson of John Coleridge, a Lord Chief Justice of England, Coleridge was educated at Eton College in Berkshire, England. He graduated from Trinity College, Oxford in 1900 with a BA.

As a young man he often travelled the law circuits with his father, and went with him to the United States, where he later claimed to have danced down Broadway with Ellen Terry. Coleridge served as a lieutenant in the 3rd Battalion, the Devonshire Regiment until resigning his commission in 1901. He served in World War I in the 4th Battalion of the Devonshire Regiment, and was promoted Acting Captain in April 1917. Coleridge left the Army in 1919. He succeeded to the title of 3rd Baron Coleridge of Ottery St. Mary on 24 September 1927 after the death of his father.

In 1930 Coleridge and his wife were approached by Canadian academic Kathleen Coburn for permission to examine the family archive at The Chanter's House for material written by his great-great-great uncle, Samuel Taylor Coleridge. The Coleridges mistakenly thought Coburn was interested in the house and its furniture. She later wrote,

When I said it was chiefly in any manuscripts and annotated books of the poet in the library, I could see even [Lady Coleridge's] self-control quail. Not a word was said. Geoffrey Coleridge bantered: "Old Sam was only a poet, you know, never did anything practical that was any good to anybody, actually not thought much of in the family, a bit of a disgrace in fact ... why a young girl like you should spend your time on the old reprobate, I can't think! ... Now I at least know something about beef cattle ...".

Coburn wrote that Coleridge

...had a brusque, dry, caustic tongue which could be rude or frightening if intuition didn't tell one that the last thing to do was be offended or frightened. With Lady Coleridge's gentle encouragement I cheerfully returned his grapeshot.

Realising that her intentions were serious, he gave her unlimited access to the Coleridge family archive, which he allowed her to have photographed and the copies placed in the British Museum, and granted her permission to edit and publish the Notebooks. In 1949 Coburn was instrumental in negotiating the sale of this Chanter's House archive to the British Museum for £10,200, with a donation from the Pilgrim Trust. The collection was eventually deposited with the British Museum in May 1951.

Coleridge held the office of Justice of the Peace for Devon from 1929 to 1952. He married Jessie Alethea Mackarness (1880–1957), daughter of George Evelyn Mackarness, on 14 September 1904 at St. Michael's Church in Sandhurst. They had three sons, the oldest, Richard Duke Coleridge succeeding to the barony on his father's death.

Coleridge died of a heart attack at the family home, The Chanter's House in Ottery St Mary in 1955, aged 77.

Coat of arms of Geoffrey Coleridge, 3rd Baron Coleridge

Crest
A crucifix Or rising from an otter as in the arms.
Escutcheon
Argent on a mount Vert in base an otter Proper; a chief Gules charged with a dove of the field between two crosses patée fitchée Or.
Supporters
Dexter an otter Proper, gorged with a garland of roses Gules leaved Vert, sinister a lion sable gorged as the former.

Peerage of the United Kingdom
Preceded by Bernard Coleridge	Baron Coleridge; 1927–1955	Succeeded by Richard Duke Coleridge
