= Ernest Hartley Coleridge =

British literary scholar and poet (1846–1920)

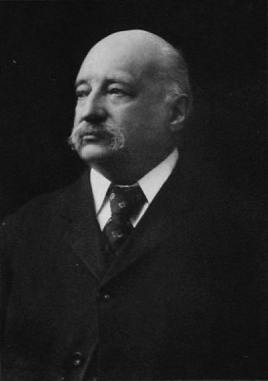
- A portrait of Ernest Hartley Coleridge; displayed at the Coleridge Cottage
- Born: 1846
- Died: February 1920 (aged 73–74); Aylesbury, Buckinghamshire
- Education: Highgate School, Sherborne School, Balliol College, Oxford
- Occupations: Literary scholar and poet
- Spouse: Sarah Mary Bradford (m. 1876)
- Children: 4

Ernest Hartley Coleridge (1846–1920) was a British literary scholar and poet. He was the son of Derwent Coleridge and grandson of Samuel Taylor Coleridge.

Coleridge was educated at Highgate School, Sherborne School, and Balliol College, Oxford. He did scholarly work on his grandfather's manuscripts, being the last of the Coleridges involved in their editing. He also took part in the campaign to buy the Coleridge Cottage in Nether Stowey for the nation. He provided this epitaph

Stranger, beneath this roof in byegone days
Dwelt Coleridge. Here he sang his witching lays
Of that strange Mariner, and what befel,
In mystic hour, the Lady Christabel.
And here, what time the Summer's breeze blew free,
Came Lamb, the gentle-hearted child of glee;
Here Wordsworth came, and wild-eyed Dorothy!
Now, all is silent but the taper light,
Which, from these Cottage windows shone at night,
Hath streamed afar. To these great souls was given
A double portion of the light of Heaven.

== Life ==
In 1876, he married Sarah Mary (née Bradford) of Newton Abbot, Devonshire, by whom he had two sons and two daughters. In 1894 he was secretary to Lord Coleridge, the Lord Chief Justice, to whom he was related. The following year he published the Letters of Samuel Taylor Coleridge, and a selection from his grandfather's unpublished notebooks entitled Anima Poetae. He then spent several years editing and annotating the poetical works of Lord Byron, which were published by John Murray in seven volumes between 1898 and 1903. Over the next ten years he worked on a biography of Lord Coleridge which was published in 1904 as The Life and Correspondence of John Duke, Lord Coleridge.

Coleridge died, aged 74, in February 1920 at Aylesbury, Buckinghamshire.

== Works ==
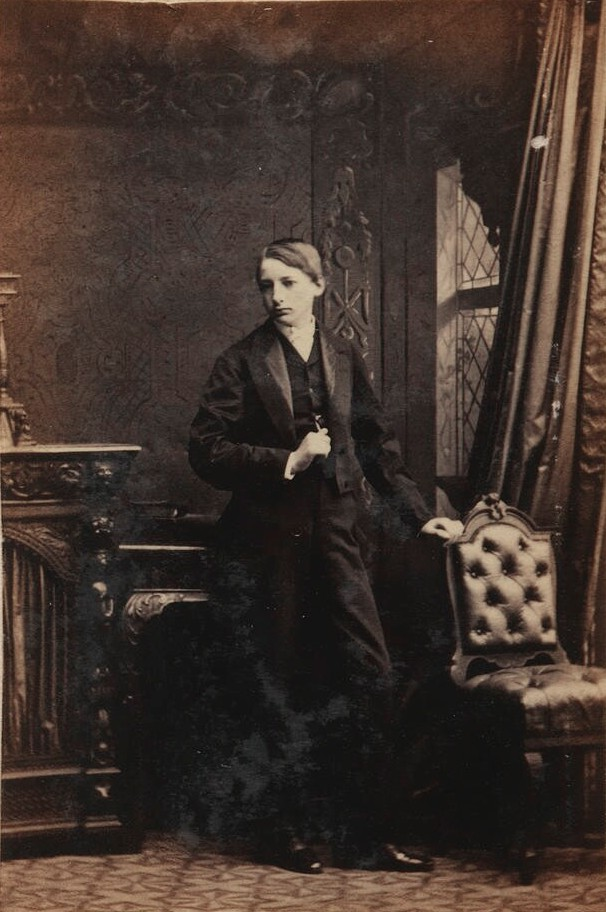
An 1862 portrait of Coleridge by Camille Silvy

- (ed.) Anima Poetae. From the Unpublished Note-Books of Samuel Taylor Coleridge, 1895
- (ed.) Letters of Samuel Taylor Coleridge, 1895
- (ed. with Rowland E. Prothero) The Works of Lord Byron, 13 vols., 1898
- Poems, 1898
- Life & Correspondence of John Duke Lord Coleridge Lord Chief Justice of England, 2 vols., 1904
- (ed.) The Complete Poetical Works of Samuel Taylor Coleridge, 1912
- The Life of Thomas Coutts Banker, 2 vols., 1920

== See also ==
- Christabel Rose Coleridge, Ernest's sister
