= William Hay, 11th Marquess of Tweeddale =

Scottish aristocrat and soldier (1884–1967)

The Right Honourable The Marquess of Tweeddale JP

Lord Lieutenant of East Lothian
- In office 17 August 1944 – 30 March 1967
- Preceded by: Walter Hepburne-Scott, 9th Lord Polwarth
- Succeeded by: David Charteris, 12th Earl of Wemyss

Personal details
- Born: William George Montagu Hay; 4 November 1884
- Died: 30 March 1967 (aged 82)
- Spouses: Marguerite Christine Ralli (m. 1912; died 1944) Marjorie Helen Nettlefold (m. 1945)
- Children: 5
- Parent(s): William Hay, 10th Marquess of Tweeddale; Candida Louisa Bartolucci
- Education: Eton College
- Alma mater: Christ Church, Oxford

William George Montagu Hay, 11th Marquess of Tweeddale JP (4 November 1884 – 30 March 1967) was a Scottish aristocrat, land owner and soldier.

== Early life ==
William George Montagu Hay was born on 4 November 1884. He was the eldest son of William Hay, 10th Marquess of Tweeddale (1826–1911) and the former Candida Louisa Bartolucci, Marchioness of Tweeddale. His brother, Lord Arthur Hay (who married Menda Ralli), was killed in 1914 during the Battle of the Aisne, and his youngest brother (and heir presumptive), was Colonel Lord Edward Douglas Hay.

His father was the third son of George Hay, 8th Marquess of Tweeddale and Lady Susan Montagu, a daughter of William Montagu, 5th Duke of Manchester. His mother was the third daughter of Vincenzo Bartolucci (son of General Luigi Bartolucci) and Clementina Dundas (second daughter of Lt. Col. Thomas Dundas, a grandson of Alexander Home, 9th Earl of Home, and Charlotte Anna Boultbee). His uncle, Arthur Hay, 9th Marquess of Tweeddale, was married to Julia Mackenzie, and after his death, she remarried to Sir John Rose, 1st Baronet and William Evans-Gordon, MP. Another uncle, Lord John Hay, was Admiral of the Fleet in 1888.

His maternal grandfather was from Cantiano in Marche, Italy and an aunt, Evelyn Bartolucci, was the second wife of Adm. Sir Astley Cooper Key.

He was educated at Eton College in Windsor before attending Christ Church, Oxford.

== Career ==
From 1903 to 1905, he was a 2nd Lieutenant to the Lothians and Berwickshire Imperial Yeomanry and the 1st Life Guards from 1905 to 1908. He also served as Lieutenant with the 1st Life Guards from 1908 to 1909 and served during World War I in France with the Guards side from 1914 to 1915. From 1915 to 1917, he was Temp Maj. of the 3rd Lowland Brigade.

In 1944, he succeeded Walter Hepburne-Scott, 9th Lord Polwarth as the Lord Lieutenant of East Lothian, serving until his death in 1967. From 1952 to 1967, he was one of four Ensigns with the Royal Company of Archers. At this time, Lord Tweeddale was Justice of the Peace for East Lothian in 1955.

== Personal life ==
On 7 December 1912, Lord Tweeddale was married to Marguerite Christine Ralli, a cousin of his brother's wife. Marguerite was the daughter of Alexander Ralli and Helen (née Carew) Ralli. After her parents' divorce, her mother remarried to Lewis Einstein, the U.S. Minister to Czechoslovakia. Her aunt, Katherine Jane Carew, was the second wife of Sir Edward Bosc Sladen, and Jessie Philippa Carew, another aunt, was the wife of Francis Stonor, 4th Baron Camoys. Together, William and Marguerite were the parents of:

- Lady Hélène Candida Hay (1913-2011), who married Lionel Berry, 2nd Viscount Kemsley in 1933.
- Lady Marguerite Georgina Christine Hay (1916–2003), who married Capt. Arthur Nicholas Coleridge (1915–1988), a grandson of the Hon. Stephen Coleridge and John Godley, 1st Baron Kilbracken, in 1941.
- Lady Christine Daphne Hay (1919–2000), who married Lt. Col. David Morley-Fletcher, son of Bernard Morley-Fletcher, in 1939. They divorced in 1947 and she remarried to Lt. Col. Francis Robert Cameron Stewart, son of Sir Francis Hugh Stewart, in 1957.
- Lady Frances Elizabeth Anne Hay (1926–2023), who married Nigel Arthur Pearson (d. 1975), only son of Sir Neville Pearson, 2nd Baronet, in 1956.
- Lord Hay (1928–1928), an unnamed son who died at birth.

After the death of his first wife on 15 October 1944, Lord Tweeddale remarried to Marjorie Helen (née Wagg) Nettlefold on 24 March 1945. Marjorie was the former wife of Lt. Col. Joseph Henry Nettlefold and a daughter of Henry John Wagg OBE.

Lord Tweeddale died on 30 March 1967. His only son died before him, so he was succeeded in his titles by his nephew, David George Montagu Hay, who became the 12th Marquess of Tweeddale. After his death, the family estate, Yester House, was sold in the late 1960s to two antique-dealers. In 1972, it was bought by the Italian-American composer Gian Carlo Menotti because of the acoustics of the ballroom. His widow, the Dowager Marchioness of Tweeddale died on 24 November 1977.

Honorary titles
Preceded by The 9th Lord Polwarth	Lord Lieutenant of East Lothian; 1944–1967	Succeeded by The 12th Earl of Wemyss
Peerage of Scotland
Preceded by William Hay	Marquess of Tweeddale; 1911–1967	Succeeded by David Hay
Peerage of the United Kingdom
Preceded by William Hay	Baron Tweeddale of Yester; 1911–1967	Succeeded by David Hay
