= Rudmore =

District in Portsmouth, Hampshire, England

Coordinates: 50.814°N 1.083°W

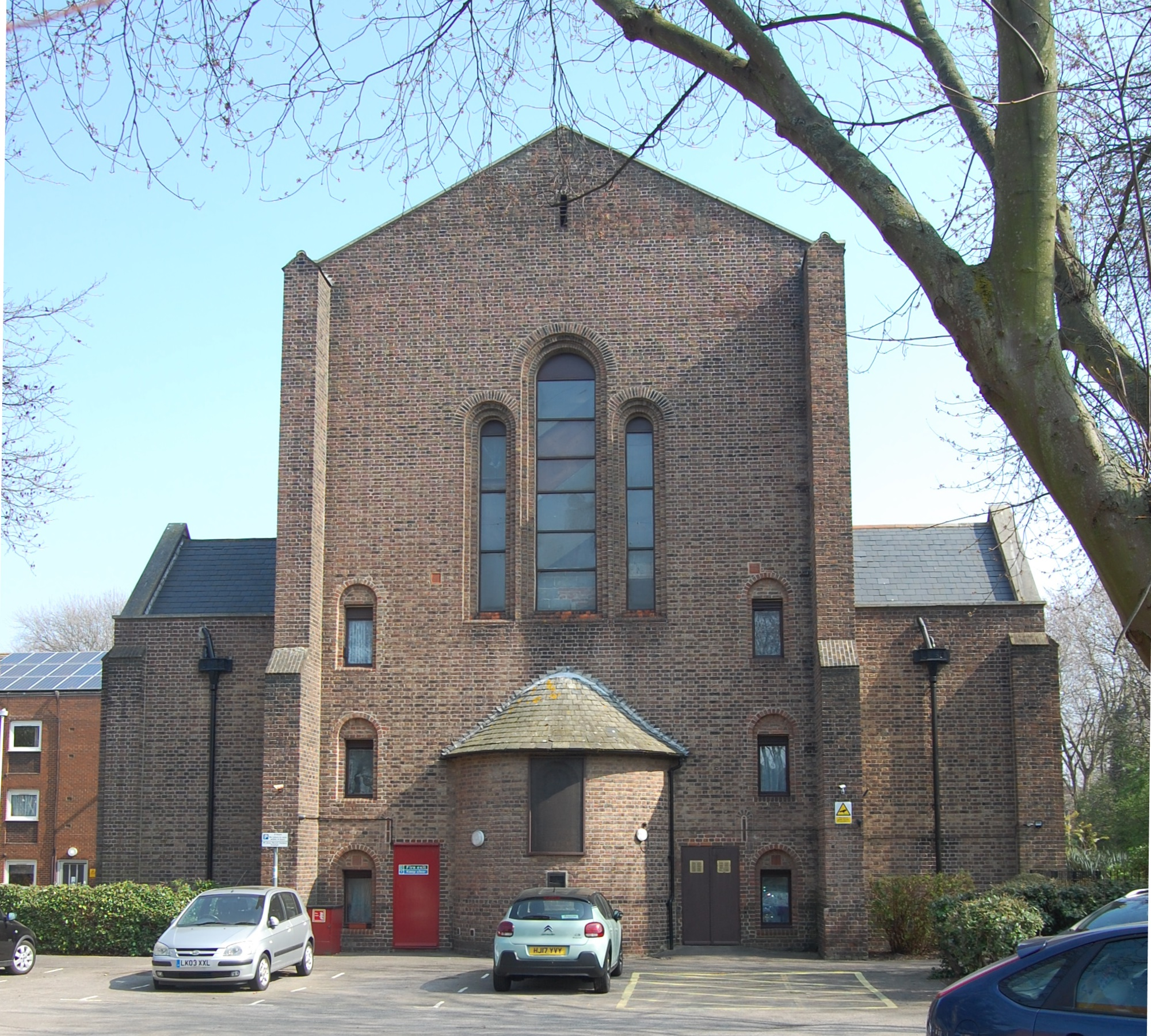
Former church of St John the Baptist, Rudmore, designed by J. D. Coleridge

Rudmore is a district located on the western shore of Portsea Island and is part of the city of Portsmouth, England.

Rudmore was a mainly residential area, mainly catering for employees of the naval dockyard and their families. It was heavily damaged by bombing during the Second World War. In the late 1960s and early 1970s, much of the area was cleared to make way for the M275 motorway and the Portsmouth International Port. The parish church was St John the Baptist, and is now flats. The church was completed in 1916 and suffered bomb damaged in the 1940s. It was repaired in the 1950s and 1960s and was converted into flats between 1986 and 1987.

Rudmore also lends its name to a major road intersection known as The Rudmore Roundabout, which connects the M275 motorway, the A3 trunk road to London and A2047 Kingston Crescent.

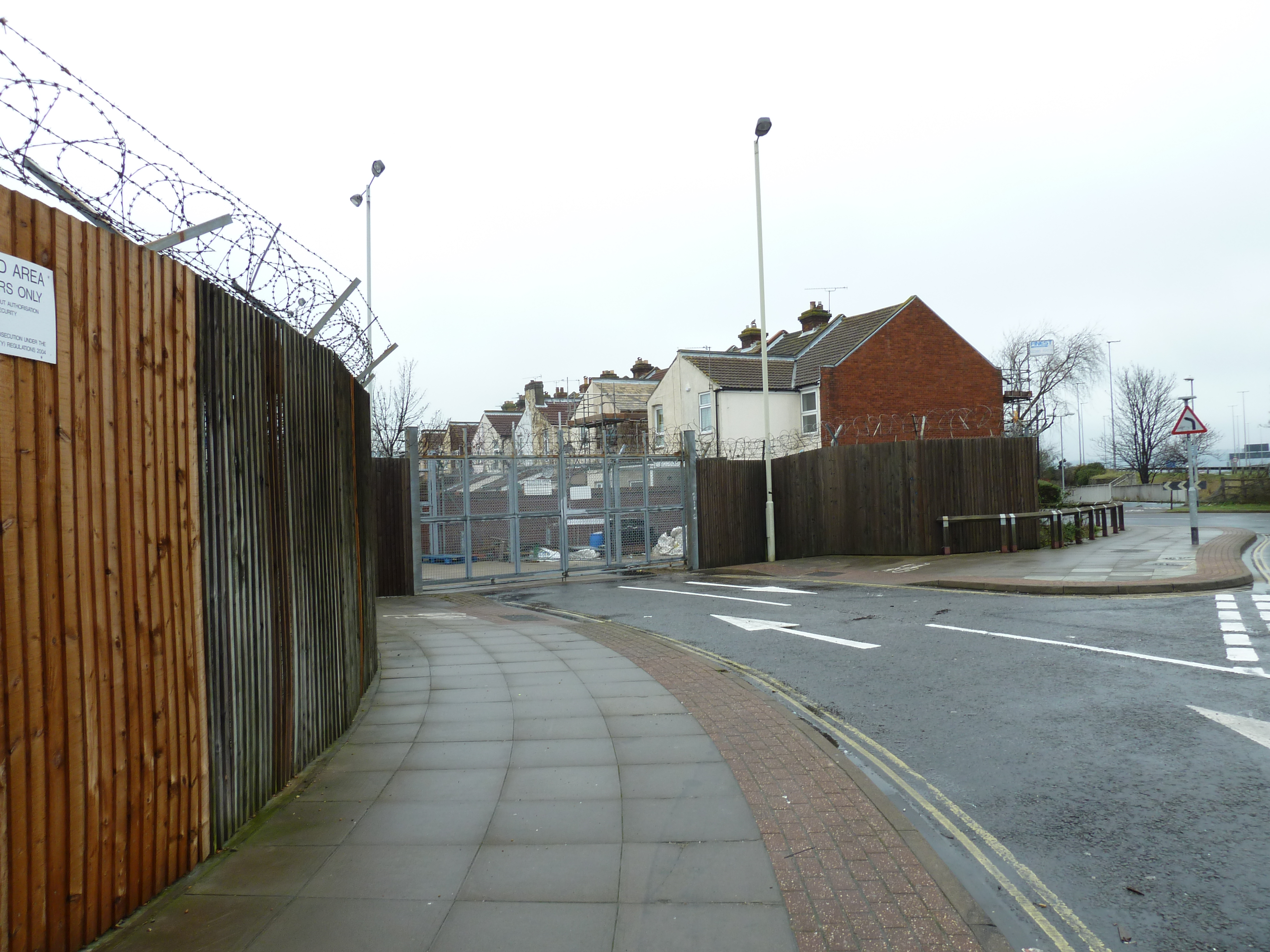
A Rudmore street in 2011
