= William Coleridge, 5th Baron Coleridge =

British hereditary peer (1937–2025)

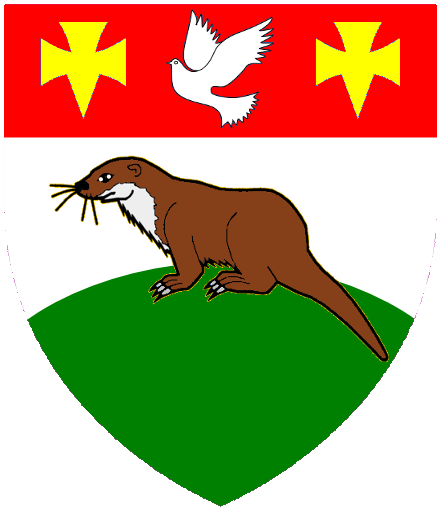
Coat of arms

William Duke Coleridge, 5th Baron Coleridge, DL (18 June 1937 – 19 November 2025) was a British hereditary peer who lived in Ottery St Mary in Devon, England.

== Biography ==
The son of Richard Coleridge, 4th Baron Coleridge, Coleridge was born on 18 June 1937 in Ottery St Mary. He was educated at Eton College in Berkshire, England, and at the Royal Military Academy Sandhurst in Berkshire. He served as an officer in the Coldstream Guards in Kenya between 1961 and 1963. During that posting he and two co-drivers won the East African Safari Rally in competition with 77 other cars. Coleridge was Commander of the Guards Independent Parachute Company between 1970 and 1972. He was Governor of the Royal West of England School for the Deaf. He retired from the British Army's Coldstream Guards with the rank of Major in 1977. He succeeded to the title of 5th Baron Coleridge of Ottery St. Mary in 1984 on the death of his father, the 4th Baron.

Coleridge married Everild Tania Hambrough, the daughter of Lieutenant Colonel Beauchamp Hambrough, on 17 February 1962. They had three children, including Coleridge's only son, James Duke Coleridge (born 5 June 1967), now 6th Baron Coleridge. A daughter is the model and actress Tania Harcourt-Cooze. The marriage was dissolved in 1977. Later that year, he married nurse and explorer Pamela Baker (24 July 1947 – 12 August 2018), daughter of George William Baker. He had two children from this second marriage. Lady Coleridge died on 12 August 2018. He married for the third time on 15 September 2020, to Rosemary, Viscountess Exmouth.

Coleridge died from complications of a fall on 19 November 2025, at the age of 88.

The ancestral home is The Chanter's House in Ottery St Mary in Devon. Coleridge was the last family member to live there because the increasing costs of maintaining the property caused the family trust in October 2006 to put the property up for sale and auction the contents. In 1999, Coleridge had attempted to lease part of the family estate in order to raise money to prevent the sale.

Coat of arms of William Coleridge, 5th Baron Coleridge

Crest
A crucifix or rising from an otter as in the arms.
Escutcheon
Argent on a mount Vert in base an otter Proper; a chief Gules charged with a dove of the field between two crosses patée fitchée Or.
Supporters
Dexter an otter Proper, gorged with a garland of roses Gules leaved Vert, sinister a lion sable gorged as the former.

Peerage of the United Kingdom
Preceded by Richard Coleridge	Baron Coleridge; 1984–2025; Member of the House of Lords (1984–1999)	Succeeded by James Coleridge
