= Nicholas Coleridge =

British media executive (born 1957)

Sir Nicholas Coleridge CBE DL
- Coleridge in 2014
- Born: Nicholas David Coleridge; 4 March 1957 (age 69); London, England
- Education: Trinity College, Cambridge
- Occupations: Provost, Eton College; Chairman, Historic Royal Palaces
- Spouse: Georgia Metcalfe
- Children: 4

Sir Nicholas David Coleridge, CBE, DL (born 4 March 1957) is a British former media executive, author, and cultural chair. He is chairman of Historic Royal Palaces (2023–), Provost of Eton (2024–) and Chair of The King's Foundation (2026-). He was appointed a Knight Bachelor in the 2022 Birthday Honours for services to museums, publishing and the creative industries.

== Early life ==
Coleridge was born in London, the son of David Coleridge, the great-great-great-great nephew of Romantic poet Samuel Taylor Coleridge, who was chairman of Lloyd's of London in the late 1980s. He is the eldest of three brothers, and educated at Ashdown House, Eton College and Trinity College, Cambridge, where he studied theology and history of art. As an Eton schoolboy he won the Jeremy Thorpe prize for debating with his schoolfriend Craig Brown; the prize was later renamed when Thorpe's reputation fell under a shadow.

== Career ==
Coleridge has served as chairman of The Victoria and Albert Museum, chairman and president of Conde Nast, co-chair of The Platinum Jubilee Pageant for the late Queen Elizabeth II, chairman of the PPA – the Professional Publishers' Association – and two-term chairman of the British Fashion Council for four years, overseeing London Fashion Week for the Department of Trade and Industry. In 2002, as chairman of the British Fashion Council, he suggested that the then Sunday Times fashion editor, Colin McDowell, was habitually too negative about British fashion designers. This drew criticism from McDowell, who accused Coleridge of jingoism.

From 1989 to 2019, Coleridge was successively editorial director of Condé Nast Britain, managing director, Condé Nast Britain (1991–2017), vice president, Condé Nast International and president, Condé Nast International, the division of Condé Nast which publishes 139 magazines in 27 international markets, and over 100 websites. He was described by Campaign magazine in 2012 as “magazines' most compelling advocate for almost two decades”. Coleridge initiated Condé Nast's Vogue College of Fashion and Design in 2013, a degree-awarding academic institution in London's Soho. From 2017 to 2019, he was chairman of Condé Nast Britain.

Coleridge was the chairman of the Victoria and Albert museum (2015–23). During his tenure, the museum opened its Exhibition Road courtyard, the Blavatnik Hall and Sainsbury Gallery, V&A Dundee in Scotland, Young V&A in Bethnal Green and initiated the two new museums on the Olympic Park – V&A Storehouse and V&A East.

From 2008 to 2024, Coleridge was successively vice chairman and chairman (2013–2024) of HM The King's Campaign For Wool, a global endeavour established to promote the sheep and wool industries, as well as sustainability and biodiversity.

Coleridge was founding chairman of Fashion Rocks, the fashion and rock music extravaganza showcasing the world's eighteen top fashion designers including Dior, Chanel, Prada and Ralph Lauren paired with eighteen top music artists including Beyoncé, Robbie Williams, Bryan Ferry and David Bowie.

Coleridge has been a member of the council of the Royal College of Art, and a member of the trading board of the Prince's Trust. He was a director of PressBof, the parent organisation of the Press Complaints Commission, 2007–2014. He is an Honorary Bencher of the Middle Temple, an ambassador for the Landmark Trust and a patron of the Elephant Family.

As a journalist, Coleridge has been an contributor to The Daily Telegraph, Sunday Telegraph, The Spectator and the Financial Times. In 1976, between school and university, he was a cub reporter on the Falmouth Packet newspaper in Cornwall. From 1979 to 1982 he was associate editor of the Tatler, working for then editor Tina Brown; from 1982 to 1985 he was a columnist at the Evening Standard. While on assignment making a television documentary about Tamil terrorism in Sri Lanka in 1984, he was arrested and jailed for ten days in Welikada prison, Colombo, where he embarked upon writing a collection of short stories, How I Met My Wife. From 1986 to 1989 he was editor-in-chief of Harpers & Queen magazine, a Hearst title, before joining Condé Nast.

Coleridge has written fourteen books, both fiction and non-fiction, based either upon his professional life (The Fashion Conspiracy, Paper Tigers, With Friends Like These) or epic novels (Godchildren, A Much Married Man, Deadly Sins, The Adventuress.) The Fashion Conspiracy was the UK Number 1 bestseller. His memoirs, The Glossy Years: Magazines, Museums and Selective Memoirs were published in 2019.

== Personal life ==
Coleridge is married to Georgia Metcalfe, an author and healer, and they have four children. They live in Chelsea, London, and in Worcestershire. The December 2007 issue of Condé Nast's World of Interiors magazine contains a feature on his country house, the 1709 Wolverton Hall in Worcestershire. In 2020, he commissioned a 46-foot Folly by the architect Quinlan Terry in a Georgian/Tudor/Jacobean style, which won a Georgian Group award in 2021.

== Honours and awards ==
Coleridge was the 1982 British Press Awards Young Journalist of the Year, as a columnist at the Evening Standard, and was given the Mark Boxer Lifetime Achievement Award for magazine journalism by the British Society of Magazine Editors in 2001. In 2013, he was awarded the Marcus Morris Lifetime Achievement Award for publishing by the Professional Publishers Association (PPA). In June 2017, he was inducted into the Professional Publishers Association's Hall of Fame by Lord Heseltine. In May 2018 he was awarded the lifetime "Outstanding Contribution to British Media" Prize at the British Media Awards.

Coleridge was appointed Commander of the Order of the British Empire (CBE) in the 2009 Birthday Honours and was knighted in the 2022 Birthday Honours for services to museums, publishing and the creative industries. He was appointed a deputy lieutenant for Worcestershire in 2022. In September 2023, he was awarded an Honorary Doctorate of Literature and Honorary Fellowship by the University of Worcester, and an Honorary Doctorate of Arts by the University of Buckingham.

A portrait of Coleridge by photographer William Teakle is in the collection of the National Portrait Gallery, London.
