= Bernard Coleridge, 2nd Baron Coleridge =

British lawyer, judge and Liberal politician

The Right Honourable The Lord Coleridge KC JP FRSL
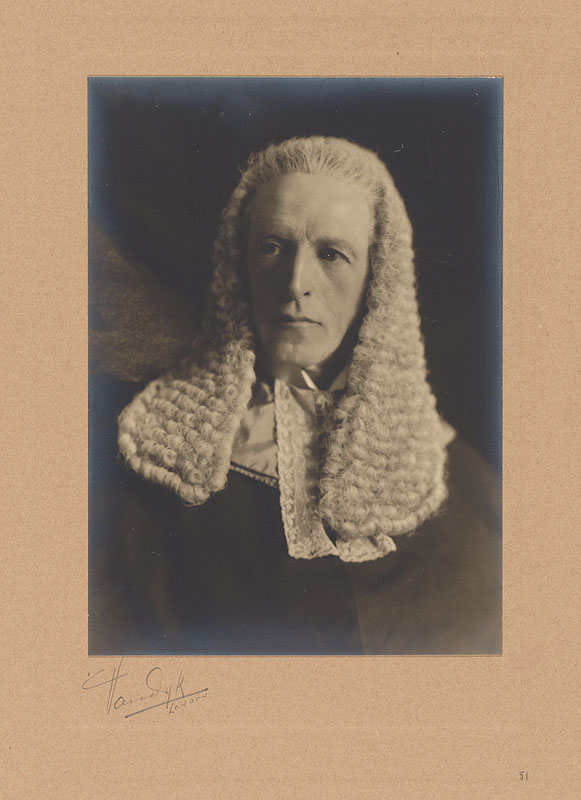
- Born: 19 August 1851
- Died: 4 September 1927 (aged 76)
- Occupation(s): Lawyer, judge, politician
- Spouse: Mary Alethea Mackarness
- Children: 3
- Parent(s): John Duke Coleridge; Jane Fortescue Seymour

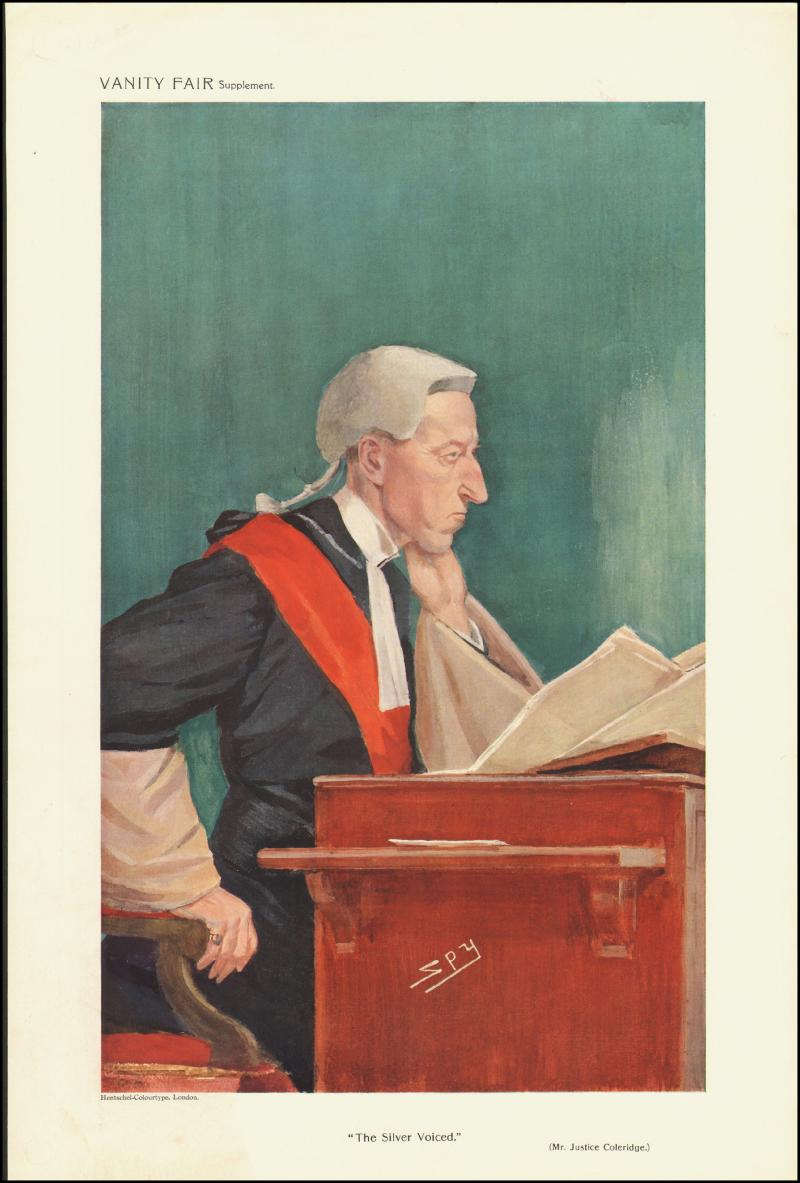
"The Silver Voiced", caricature by Spy from 1909.

Bernard John Seymour Coleridge, 2nd Baron Coleridge (19 August 1851 – 4 September 1927) was a British lawyer, judge, and Liberal politician who sat in the House of Commons from 1885 until 1894 when he inherited his peerage.

== Biography ==
Coleridge was the eldest son of John Coleridge, 1st Baron Coleridge, Lord Chief Justice of England, and Jane Fortescue Seymour. His grandfather, John Taylor Coleridge, was the nephew of the poet Samuel Taylor Coleridge. He was educated at Eton and Trinity College, Oxford. He was called to the bar at Middle Temple in 1877.

Coleridge was elected member of parliament for Sheffield Attercliffe in the 1885 general election and held the seat until 1894 when he succeeded his father as second Baron Coleridge. He was the first peer to regularly practice at the bar.

Coleridge became a QC in 1892 and served as a Judge of the High Court of Justice from 1907 to 1923. During his legal career, he also sat in the quarter sessions for Devonshire, the Midland Circuit Assize, and was a justice of the peace.

He was a Fellow of the Royal Society of Literature.

Lord Coleridge married Mary Alethea Mackarness, daughter of John Fielder Mackarness (Bishop of Oxford), on 3 August 1876. They had three children, one son and two daughters. He died in September 1927, in Honiton, Devon, aged 76, and was succeeded in the barony by his only son Geoffrey.

== Selected bibliography ==
- The Story of a Devonshire House. London: T. Fisher Unwin, 1905.
- This for Remembrance. London: T. Fisher Unwin, 1925.

== Arms ==
Coat of arms of Bernard Coleridge, 2nd Baron Coleridge
Crest A crucifix Or rising from an otter as in the arms. Escutcheon Argent on a mount Vert in base an otter Proper; a chief Gules charged with a dove of the field between two crosses patée fitchée Or. Supporters Dexter an otter Proper, gorged with a garland of roses Gules leaved Vert, sinister a lion sable gorged as the former. Motto Qualis vita finis ita

Parliament of the United Kingdom
New constituency	Member of Parliament for Sheffield Attercliffe; 1885–1894	Succeeded by J. Batty Langley
Peerage of the United Kingdom
Preceded by John Duke Coleridge	Baron Coleridge; 1894–1927	Succeeded by Geoffrey Duke Coleridge
