= David Coleridge =

British insurance underwriter (1932–2020)

- Born: June 7, 1932; Bombay, India
- Died: December 26, 2020 (aged 88); United Kingdom
- Occupations: Insurance underwriter and business executive
- Known for: Chairman of Lloyd's of London 1991-1992
- Spouse: Susan Senior (m. 1955)
- Children: Three including Nicholas Coleridge

David Ean Coleridge (7 June 1932 – 26 December 2020) was a British insurance underwriter who briefly served as the chairman of Lloyd's from 1991 until 1992, during one of the most tumultuous periods in its history.

== Early life ==
The son of a cotton broker, Coleridge was a great-great-great-great nephew of the poet Samuel Taylor Coleridge. He was educated at Eton College, where he was a prefect. Having been turned down for National Service and failed to be admitted to Oxford.

== Career ==
He entered Lloyd's, working initially for a small broking firm. After five years, he became a member of Lloyd's.

== Personal life ==
He married Susan Senior in 1955, whom he had met at a cocktail party. He had three sons, including Sir Nicholas Coleridge.

He died on 26 December 2020.
