= SS Empire Coleridge =

World War II merchant ship of the United Kingdom

History
- Name: Empire Coleridge (1942-46); Esso Cheyenne (1946-61)
- Owner: Ministry of War Transport (1942-46); Anglo-American Oil Co Ltd (1946-61)
- Operator: Anglo-American Oil Co Ltd
- Port of registry: (United Kingdom) Sunderland
- Builder: Sir J Laing & Sons Ltd
- Launched: 17 March 1942
- Completed: May 1942
- Identification: Code Letters BDXQ; United Kingdom Official Number 169020
- Fate: Scrapped

General characteristics
- Class & type: Tanker
- Tonnage: 9,793 GRT; 5,772 NRT
- Length: 484 ft 0 in (147.52 m)
- Beam: 68 ft 3 in (20.80 m)
- Depth: 36 ft 1 in (11.00 m)
- Installed power: Triple expansion steam engine
- Propulsion: Screw propeller
- Armament: Anti-torpedo nets (Empire Coleridge)

Empire Coleridge was a 9,811 GRT tanker which was built in 1942 by Sir J Laing & Sons Ltd, Sunderland for the Ministry of War Transport (MoWT). In 1946 she was sold into merchant service and renamed Esso Cheyenne. She was scrapped in 1961.

== Description ==
The ship was built by Sir J Laing & Sons Ltd, Sunderland. She was launched on 17 March 1942 and completed in May 1942.

The ship was 484 feet 0 inches (147.52 m) long, with a beam of 68 feet 3 inches (20.80 m) and a depth of 36 feet 1 inch (11.00 m). She had a GRT of 9,793 and a NRT of 5,772.

The ship was propelled by a triple expansion steam engine, which had cylinders of 27 inches (69 cm), 44 inches (110 cm) and 76 inches (190 cm) diameter by 48 inches (120 cm) stroke. The engine was built by North East Marine Engine Co (1938) Ltd, Newcastle upon Tyne.

== History ==
Empire Coleridge was built for the MoWT. She was placed under the management of the Anglo-American Oil Co Ltd. Her port of registry was Sunderland. The Code Letters BDXQ and United Kingdom Official Number 169020 were allocated.

Empire Coleridge was a member of a number of convoys during the Second World War.

HX 239

Convoy HX 239 departed New York on 13 May 1943 and arrived at Liverpool on 28 May. Empire Coleridge was bound for Avonmouth, Somerset. Empire Coleridge was equipped with anti-torpedo nets. She was praised by the Convoy Commodore for her exceptional behaviour while a member of the convoy.

HX 254

Convoy HX 254 departed New York on 27 August 1943 and arrived at Liverpool on 12 September. Empire Coleridge was bound for Thameshaven, Thurrock.

In 1946, Empire Coleridge was sold to the Anglo-American Oil Co Ltd, London. She was renamed Esso Cheyenne. She served until 1961, arriving on 15 April at Boom, Belgium for scrapping.
