= Christabel Rose Coleridge =

English novelist and children's magazine editor (1843–1921)

- Born: 25 May 1843; London, England
- Died: 14 November 1921 (aged 78); Torquay, Devon, England
- Occupations: Writer, editor
- Parent: Derwent Coleridge
- Writing career
- Period: 19th century
- Genre: Children's literature

Christabel Rose Coleridge (25 May 1843 – 14 November 1921) was an English novelist and an editor of girls' magazines, sometimes in collaboration with the novelist Charlotte Mary Yonge. Her views on the role of women in society were conservative.

== Early life ==
A granddaughter of the poet, Samuel Coleridge, Christabel was born at St Mark's College, Chelsea, while her father, Derwent, was headmaster there. Her name pays homage to Samuel Coleridge's poem "Christabel". For a time, Coleridge helped her brother Ernest to run a school, but her ambition was to be a writer.

== Writings, friendships ==
She went on to publish more than 15 novels. The first was a children's historical story called Lady Betty (1869). Minstrel Dick (1896) is set mainly in the 14th-century Berkhamsted court of the dying Edward, the Black Prince. Her fiction expressed her concern with morality, and several of her books were published by the Society for Promoting Christian Knowledge.

Christabel was a friend of Charlotte Yonge's, distantly related to her through Mary Elizabeth Coleridge, who like Christabel had been one of Yonge's informal society, the Goslings. They collaborated on several writing projects, such as The Miz Maze or The Winkworth Puzzle: A Story in Letters, by Nine Authors (1883).

In the early 1890s, Christabel and her "Mother Goose" edited The Monthly Packet, which Yonge had founded 40 years earlier as an Anglican magazine for middle-class girls, as The Monthly Packet of Evening Readings for Younger Members of the English Church. Coleridge was the sole editor during its last six years, from 1894 to 1899. She also edited a magazine intended for the working-class members of the church-based Girls' Friendly Society. After Yonge's death she wrote and edited the biographical Charlotte Mary Yonge: Her Life and Letters (1903).

Another friend was Frances Mary Peard (1835–1923), who wrote more than 40 books published from 1867 to 1909, mostly domestic novels and short-story volumes.

== Life's work ==
Christabel Rose Coleridge had at least 89 works of hers published in a total of at least 286 publications.

In 1880, Christabel moved to Torquay when her father retired there. She had conservative ideas about the role of women in society, and a collection of her essays on the subject was published in 1894, The Daughters Who Have Not Revolted. Her last novel, Miss Lucy: A Character Study, was published in 1908.

Christabel Rose Coleridge's life ended on 14 November 1921 in Torquay, Devon, at the age of 78.
