= Coleridge-Taylor (disambiguation) =

Samuel Coleridge-Taylor (1875–1912) was an English composer and conductor.

Coleridge-Taylor may also refer to:

- Coleridge-Taylor Elementary School, a public school in Louisville, Kentucky

== People with the name ==
- Avril Coleridge-Taylor, (1903–1998), English pianist, conductor, and composer, daughter of Samuel
- Hiawatha Bryan Coleridge-Taylor (1900–1980), English conductor, music publisher and doctor, son of Samuel
- Coleridge-Taylor Perkinson (1932–2004), American composer

== See also ==
- Samuel Taylor Coleridge (1772–1834), English poet, literary critic, philosopher and theologian
