= Derwent Coleridge =

British writer and priest (1800–1883)

The Reverend Derwent Coleridge
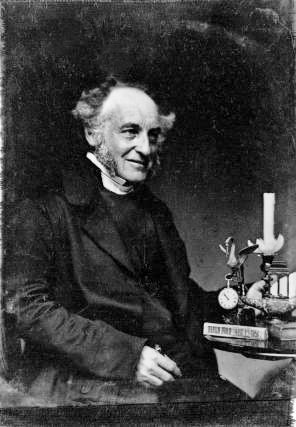
- Born: 14 September 1800; Keswick, Cumberland, England
- Died: 28 March 1883 (aged 82); Torquay, Devon, England
- Education: St. John's College, Cambridge
- Occupations: Educator, scholar and author
- Children: Ernest Hartley Coleridge; Christabel Rose Coleridge; Derwent Moultrie Coleridge
- Parents: Samuel Taylor Coleridge; Sarah Fricker
- Relatives: Hartley Coleridge (brother); Sara Coleridge (sister)

Derwent Coleridge (14 September 1800 – 28 March 1883), third son of Samuel Taylor Coleridge, was a distinguished English scholar and author.

== Early life ==
Derwent Coleridge was born at Keswick, Cumberland, 14 September 1800 (Derwent Water is not far away). He was sent with his brother Hartley to be educated at a small school near Ambleside. The two brothers were in those days in continual intercourse with Southey and Wordsworth. Derwent was sent to St. John's College, Cambridge, where he formed intimate lifelong friendships with W. M. Praed, Macaulay, John Moultrie, Sidney Walker, Charles Austin, and Bulwer. In the autumn of 1822, he joined them as a contributor to Knight's Quarterly Magazine. His contributions, signed "DAVENANT CECIL", were mostly poetical. He proceeded B.A. 1824, and M.A. 1829.

After becoming estranged from his father, he moved to Plymouth, where he became a teacher. He became involved in the intellectual life of the town, joining The Plymouth Institution (now The Plymouth Athenaeum) as a lecturing member.

In 1826, he was ordained by William Carey, Bishop of Exeter; soon afterwards, he was appointed master of the grammar school at Helston, Cornwall. One of his most distinguished pupils there was Charles Kingsley. While at Helston, he published his largest work, The Scriptural Character of the English Church (1839). He agreed with the conclusions which Gladstone supported in Church Principles considered in their Results, published the following year, although Gladstone wrote as a pronounced high churchman, while Coleridge aimed at setting forth the views of his father on church and state. The avowal that he wished to be regarded as his father's disciple induced F. D. Maurice to dedicate to him his Kingdom of Christ. Coleridge's book, though eloquent, missed popularity, perhaps on account of its impartiality.

== Chelsea ==
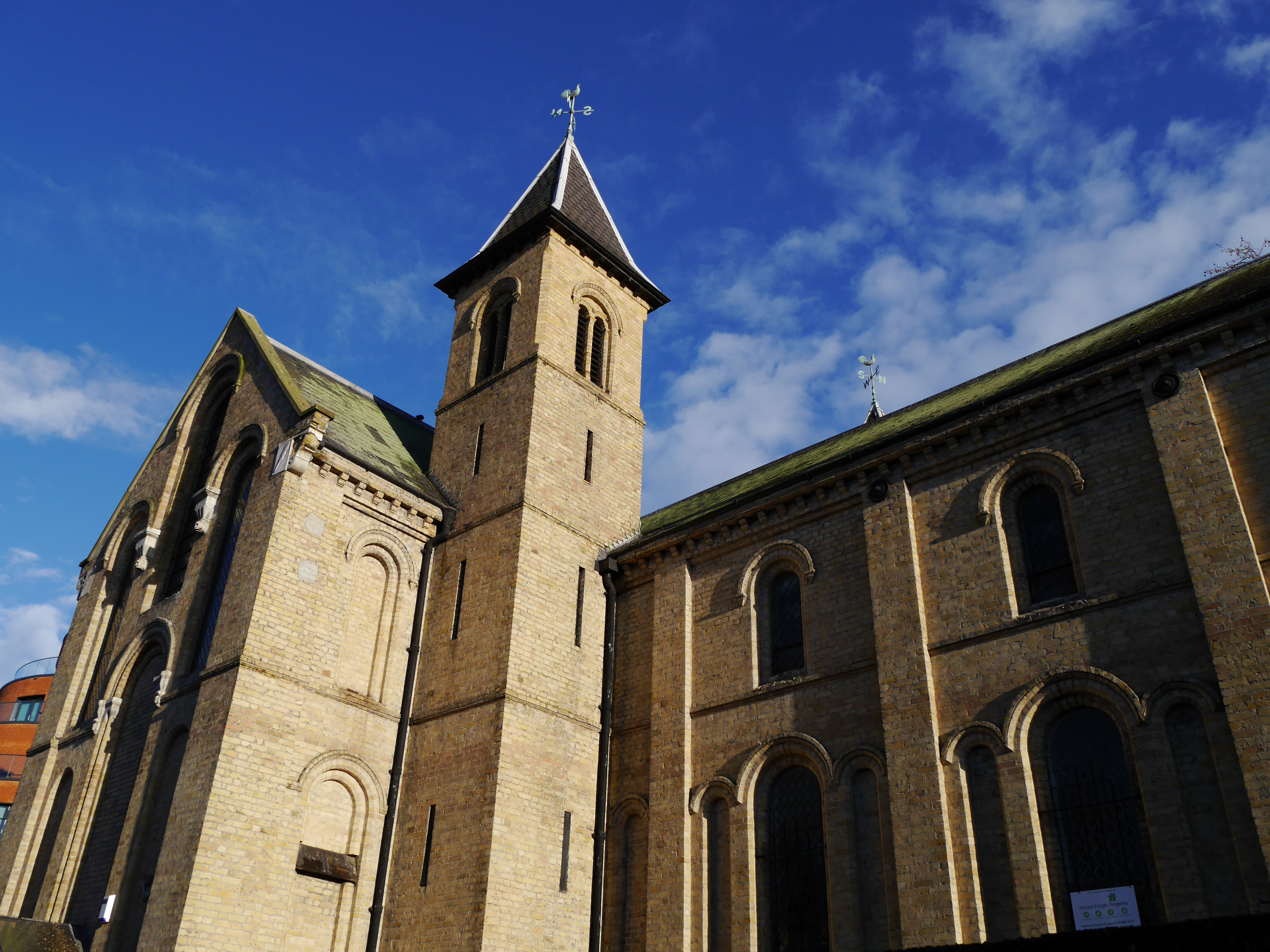
Chapel at College of St Mark and St John, Chelsea, London

In 1841, he was appointed first principal of St. Mark's College, Chelsea, just established by the National Society. He held that post until 1864, and undoubtedly did much to shape the course of elementary education in England. He was a strong advocate of Latin in mental training, placing it altogether above mathematics or physical science. The study of languages was always a passion with him. Arthur Penrhyn Stanley once declared him the most accomplished linguist in England. He could read Cervantes and Alfieri as easily as Racine and Schiller, and was well acquainted with Hungarian and Welsh poetry; of the latter he was intensely fond. He could also read not only Arabic and Coptic, but Zulu and Hawaiian.

Under his guidance sacred music was made a large part of the training of the college students. Choral services were not known in 1841, except in cathedrals, and when one was established in St. Mark's College Chapel pilgrimages used to be made to hear the novelty, not only from all parts of London, but by country clergy. ‘The chapel service is the keystone of the arch,’ he wrote in an interesting letter to Archdeacon Sinclair, published in 1842. He published several pamphlets in the course of his principalship, all evidently inspired by the desire to place the education of the people in the hands of the church, though his view of the church itself and its doctrines was by no means a narrow one. His last publication on the subject was a manifesto against compulsory education and in favour of denominational schools.

In 1846 he was appointed Prebendary of Islington in St Paul's Cathedral.

== Literary work and later life ==
His life of his brother Hartley, published in 1849, is a very well-written biography, and he also edited some of his father's works in conjunction with his sister. In 1864 the works of Praed appeared under his editorship, and with a memoir by him. In 1854 Bishop Blomfield offered him the living of Northolt, but he declined it. Ten years later he accepted from Bishop Tait the rectory of Hanwell. Finding the parish church a long way from the population, he set to work to build a new one in the midst of them, and it was consecrated on the last day of 1879, when he was in his eightieth year. His mind had lost none of its vigour when he resigned next year, but he had become subject to constant attacks of acute neuralgia, and he retired to Torquay, where he died on 28 March 1883. His wife, to whom he had been married for more than fifty-five years, survived him. He left a son (Ernest Hartley Coleridge) and a daughter (Christabel Rose Coleridge). His second son, Derwent Moultrie Coleridge, predeceased him in 1880.
