= Stephen Coleridge =

British lawyer and writer (1854–1936)

The Honourable Stephen Coleridge
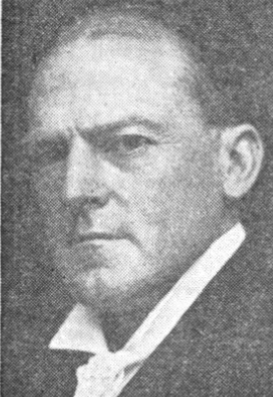
- Born: 31 May 1854
- Died: 10 April 1936 (aged 81)
- Occupations: Activist, author, barrister
- Parent(s): John Duke Coleridge; Jane Fortescue Seymour

Stephen William Buchanan Coleridge (31 May 1854 – 10 April 1936) was an English author, barrister, opponent of vivisection, and co-founder of the National Society for the Prevention of Cruelty to Children.

== Biography ==
Coleridge was the second son of John Duke Coleridge, Lord Chief Justice of England, and Jane Fortescue Seymour, an accomplished artist. His grandfather was nephew to the famous poet Samuel Taylor Coleridge. At fourteen he was sent to the public school Bradfield College. He attended Trinity College, Cambridge, where he graduated in 1878.

He was admitted to Middle Temple in July, 1875 and May, 1882. He was called to the Bar in 1886. He worked as private secretary under his father 1884–1890. He was Clerk of assize for South Wales Circuit in 1890.

Coleridge came to widespread public attention in England in 1903, when he publicly accused William Bayliss of the Department of Physiology at University College London of having broken the law during an experiment on a dog, thereby sparking the Brown Dog affair. Bayliss sued for libel and was awarded damages of £2,000.

Coleridge was also an accomplished landscape artist, who exhibited at the Alpine Club Gallery, the Suffolk Street galleries and the Royal Academy.

== Animal welfare ==
Coleridge was president of the League for the Prohibition of Cruel Sports and director of the National Anti-Vivisection Society. He resigned in 1931 from the League for the Prohibition of Cruel Sports over a difference of opinion with the committee. Coleridge commented that "I shall have nothing further to do with the League: I am not changing my views nor deserting the animals".

Under leadership of the National Anti-Vivisection Society, Coleridge supported restrictionist legislative proposals for vivisection. He envisioned progressively more stringent measures leading to total abolition. This angered members who favoured only abolition. In response, Frances Power Cobbe formed the British Union for the Abolition of Vivisection.

== Personal life ==
Coleridge married Geraldine Beatrice Lushington. Their children included the architect J. D. Coleridge.

== Selected publications ==
- Broken Gods (1903)
- Vivisection: A Heartless Science (1916)
- Great Testimony Against Scientific Cruelty (1918)

== Gallery ==
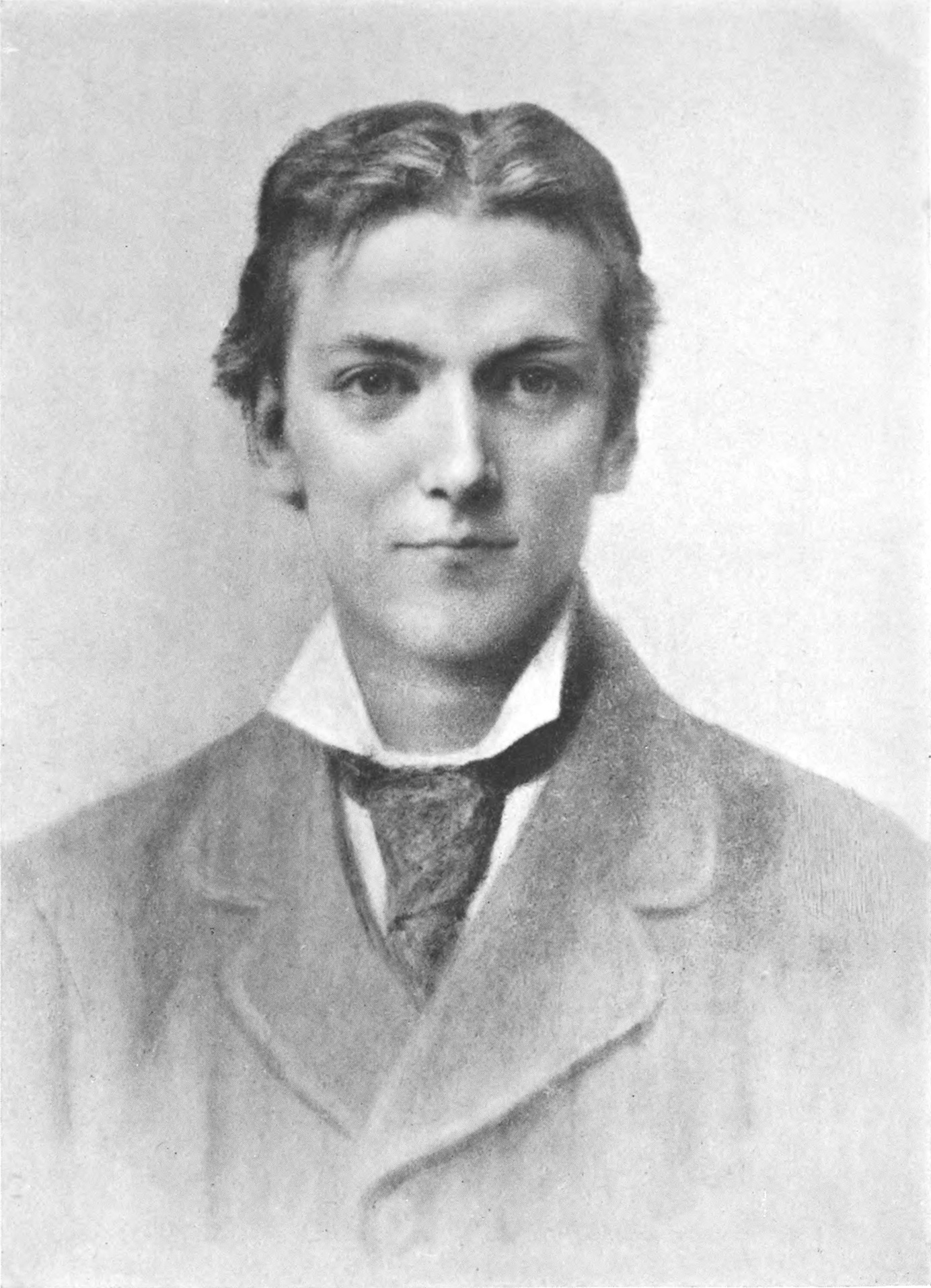
Coleridge, circa 1873

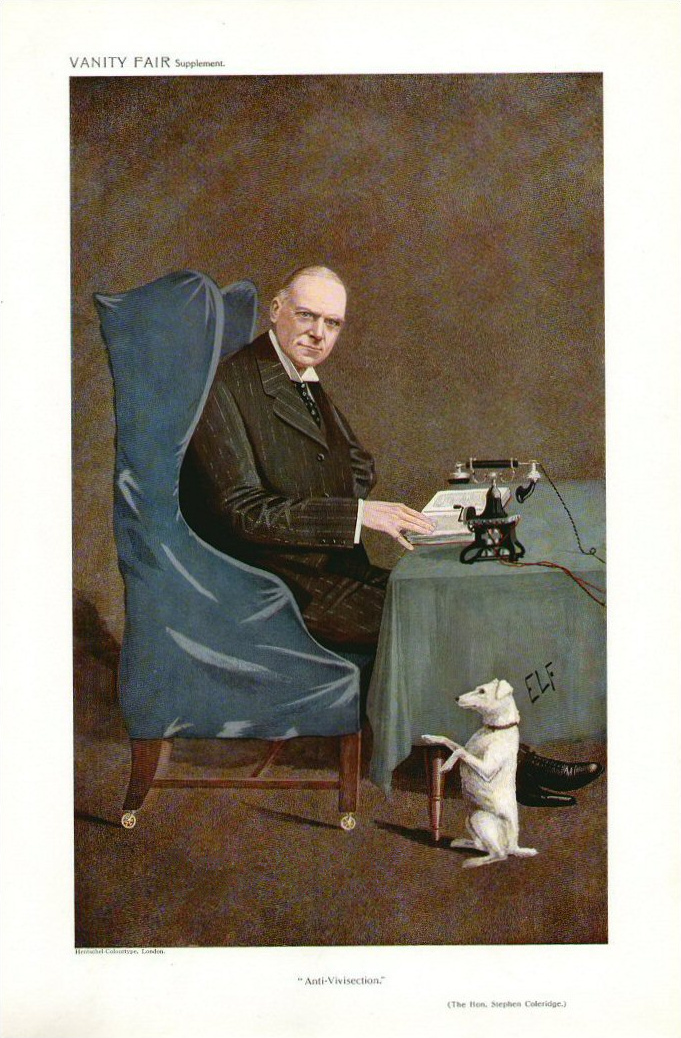
Coleridge caricatured by ELF for Vanity Fair, 1910

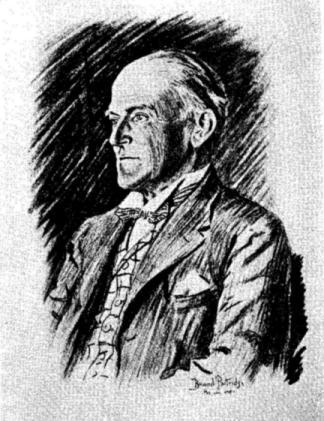
Portrait of Stephen Coleridge by Bernard Partridge
