= Baron Coleridge =

Title in the Peerage of the United Kingdom

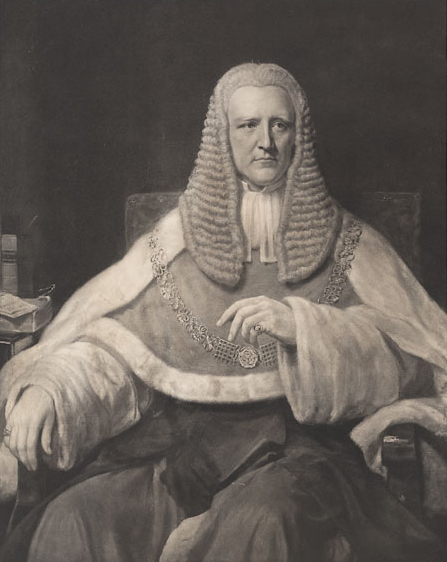
John Coleridge, 1st Baron Coleridge

Baron Coleridge, of Ottery St Mary in the County of Devon, is a title in the Peerage of the United Kingdom. It was created in 1874 for the prominent lawyer, judge and Liberal politician Sir John Coleridge. He served as Lord Chief Justice of England from 1880 to 1894. His son, the second Baron, represented Attercliffe in the House of Commons and served as a Judge of the High Court of Justice. As of 2025 the title is held by the latter's great-great-grandson, the sixth Baron, who succeeded in 2025.

The first Baron was the son of Sir John Taylor Coleridge and the great-nephew of the poet Samuel Taylor Coleridge.

The ancestral home of the Coleridge family is The Chanter's House in Ottery St Mary. In October 2006 the increasing costs of maintaining the property caused the family trust to put the property up for sale and auction the contents.

== Barons Coleridge (1874 onwards) ==
- John Duke Coleridge, 1st Baron Coleridge (1821–1894)
- Bernard John Seymour Coleridge, 2nd Baron Coleridge (1851–1927)
- Geoffrey Duke Coleridge, 3rd Baron Coleridge (1877–1955)
- Richard Duke Coleridge, 4th Baron Coleridge (1905–1984)
- William Duke Coleridge, 5th Baron Coleridge (1937–2025)
- James Duke Coleridge, 6th Baron Coleridge (born 1967)

The heir presumptive is his uncle Hon. Samuel John Taylor Coleridge (born 1942)
Next in line is the present holder's cousin Syndercombe James Duke Coleridge (born 1941), a grandson of the 3rd Baron. He has two sons, Robert James Duke (born 1979) and Nicholas John (born 1981).

== Arms ==
Coat of arms of Baron Coleridge
Crest A crucifix Or rising from an otter as in the arms. Escutcheon Argent on a mount Vert in base an otter Proper; a chief Gules charged with a dove of the field between two crosses patée fitchée Or. Supporters Dexter an otter Proper, gorged with a garland of roses Gules leaved Vert, sinister a lion sable gorged as the former.
