= Homes & Gardens =

Monthly interior design and garden design magazine

- Cover of the October 2024 issue
- Editor-in-Chief: Lucy Searle
- Categories: Interior design and garden design
- Frequency: Monthly
- Circulation: 122,230 (ABC Jul - Dec 2013); Print and digital editions
- Publisher: Future plc
- Founded: 1919
- Country: United Kingdom
- Based in: London
- Language: English
- Website: www.homesandgardens.com

Homes & Gardens is a British monthly interior design and garden design magazine published by Future plc. The magazine is based in London and began circulation in 1919. It was the UK’s first home interest magazine. The magazine is marketed to a British audience.

Homes & Gardens is a magazine and website that covers interiors, decorating, gardens, and advice from interior designers. The website has an audience of over 7.6 million monthly readers.

== History and profile ==
The magazine was launched in 1919 at George Newnes Ltd. The magazine is based in London and is published every month.

Lucy Searle is Homes & Gardens global editor-in-chief.
