= Richard Coleridge, 4th Baron Coleridge =

British navy captain(1905–1984)

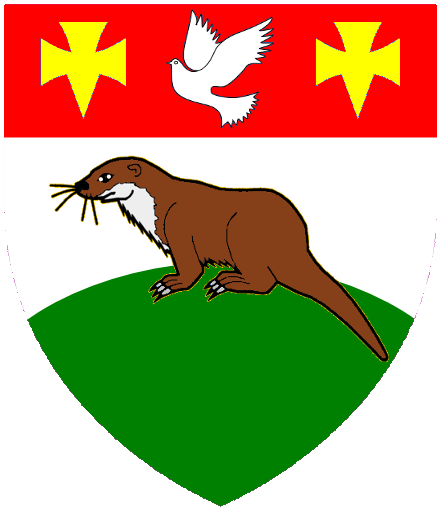
Coat of arms

Richard Duke Coleridge, 4th Baron Coleridge KBE DL (24 September 1905 – 20 May 1984) was a captain in the Royal Navy and served as the first Executive Secretary of the North Atlantic Treaty Organization (NATO) from 1952 to 1970.

== Biography ==
Coleridge was the son of Geoffrey Coleridge, 3rd Baron Coleridge of Ottery St. Mary and Jessie Alethea Mackarness. He married Cecilia Rosamund Fisher, daughter of Admiral Sir William Wordsworth Fisher, on 28 August 1936. Coleridge was educated at the Royal Naval College, Osborne, Isle of Wight and at the Royal Naval College, Dartmouth, Devon, in England. In 1926 he was promoted to sub-lieutenant with seniority, and in 1936 to lieutenant-commander. He served in World War II and was with the War Cabinet Office between 1940 and 1941.

He was with the Joint Staff Mission to Washington, D.C. in 1941, and was Deputy Secretary to the British Joint Staff and Combined Chiefs of Staff between 1942 and 1945. Coleridge was invested as an Officer of the Most Excellent Order of the British Empire (OBE) in 1944. He was decorated with the United States Legion of Merit on 27 November 1945. He was U.K. Secretary to the Military Staff Committee of the United Nations between 1946 and 1948, and was Secretary to the British Joint Services Mission to Washington, D.C., in 1948. He was Chief Staff Officer to Marshal of the Royal Air Force, Lord Tedder. He was invested as a Commander of the Most Excellent Order of the British Empire (CBE) in 1951. He was promoted to captain in the Royal Navy in 1952.

Coleridge succeeded to the title of 4th Baron Coleridge of Ottery St. Mary on 27 March 1955. He was invested as a Knight Commander of the Most Excellent Order of the British Empire (KBE) in 1971. He was the first Executive Secretary of NATO from 1952 to 1970. He was Chairman of the Devon and Exeter Savings Bank between 1971 and 1975. He held the office of Deputy Lieutenant of Devon in 1973. He was chairman of the Trustee Savings Bank between 1975 and 1984. His wife died in 1991 at age 81.

Coat of arms of Richard Coleridge, 4th Baron Coleridge

Crest
A crucifix Or rising from an otter as in the arms.
Escutcheon
Argent on a mount Vert in base an otter Proper; a chief Gules charged with a dove of the field between two crosses patée fitchée Or.
Supporters
Dexter an otter Proper, gorged with a garland of roses Gules leaved Vert, sinister a lion sable gorged as the former.

Peerage of the United Kingdom
Preceded by Geoffrey Duke Coleridge	Baron Coleridge; 1955–1984	Succeeded by William Duke Coleridge
