= John Coleridge, 1st Baron Coleridge =

British lawyer, judge and Liberal politician (1820–1894)

The Right Honourable The Lord Coleridge PC
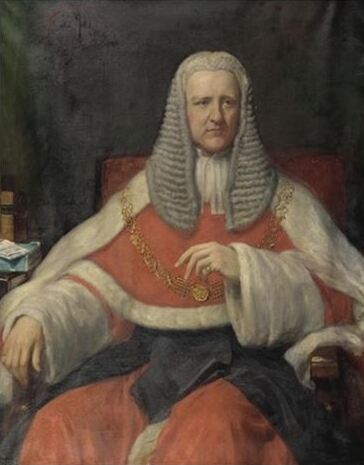
- Lord Coleridge by Eden Upton Eddis

Lord Chief Justice of England
- In office 29 November 1880 – 14 June 1894
- Monarch: Victoria
- Preceded by: Sir Alexander Cockburn, Bt
- Succeeded by: The Lord Russell of Killowen

Chief Justice of the Common Pleas
- In office November 1873 – 20 November 1880
- Monarch: Queen Victoria
- Preceded by: Sir William Bovill
- Succeeded by: Himself as Lord Chief Justice of England

Attorney General for England and Wales
- In office 10 November 1871 – 20 November 1873
- Monarch: Queen Victoria
- Prime Minister: William Ewart Gladstone
- Preceded by: Robert Collier
- Succeeded by: Henry James

Solicitor General for England and Wales
- In office 12 December 1868 – 10 November 1871
- Monarch: Queen Victoria
- Prime Minister: William Ewart Gladstone
- Preceded by: Sir Richard Baggallay
- Succeeded by: Sir George Jessel

Personal details
- Born: John Duke Coleridge; 3 December 1820 Ottery St Mary, Devon; United Kingdom
- Died: 14 June 1894 (aged 73) Westminster, London; United Kingdom
- Party: Liberal
- Spouse(s): Jane Fortescue Seymour; Amy Augusta Jackson Lawford
- Children: Mildred Coleridge; Bernard Coleridge; Stephen Coleridge; Gilbert Coleridge
- Parent: John Taylor Coleridge (father)
- Education: Eton College; Balliol College, Oxford
- Occupation: Barrister, politician

John Duke Coleridge, 1st Baron Coleridge PC (3 December 1820 – 14 June 1894) was an English lawyer, judge and Liberal politician. He held the posts, in turn, of Solicitor General for England and Wales, Attorney General for England and Wales, Chief Justice of the Common Pleas and Lord Chief Justice of England.

== Background and education ==
Coleridge was the eldest son of John Taylor Coleridge, and the great-nephew of the poet Samuel Taylor Coleridge. He was educated at Eton and Balliol College, Oxford, and was called to the bar in 1846.

Coleridge was a member of the Canterbury Association from 24 June 1851.

== Legal career ==
Coleridge established a successful legal practice on the western circuit. From 1853 to 1854 he held the post of secretary to the Royal Commission on the City of London. In 1865 he was elected to the House of Commons for Exeter for the Liberal Party. He made a favourable impression on the leaders of his party and when the Liberals came to office in 1868 under William Ewart Gladstone, Coleridge was appointed Solicitor-General. In 1871 he was promoted to Attorney-General, a post he held until 1873. In 1871 he was also involved in the high-publicity Tichborne Case. In 1873 he was described by the Manchester-based Women's Suffrage Journal as a "firm and consistent" supporter of women's suffrage.

In November 1873 Coleridge succeeded Sir William Bovill as Chief Justice of the Common Pleas, and in January 1874 was raised to the peerage as Baron Coleridge, of Ottery St Mary in the County of Devon.

In 1875, the three English common law courts (the Court of Queen's Bench, the Court of Common Pleas, and the Court of the Exchequer) merged to become divisions of the new High Court of Justice. The head of each court (Lord Chief Justice Sir Alexander Cockburn, Chief Justice of the Common Pleas Lord Coleridge, and Chief Baron of the Exchequer Sir Fitzroy Kelly) continued in post. After the deaths of Kelly and Cockburn in 1880, the three divisions were merged into a single division, with Lord Coleridge as Lord Chief Justice of England. In 1884, he was elected as a member of the American Philosophical Society. Despite his health failing towards the end of his life he remained in this office until his death on 14 June 1894, aged 74, at his house in Sussex Square in Paddington.

== Family ==
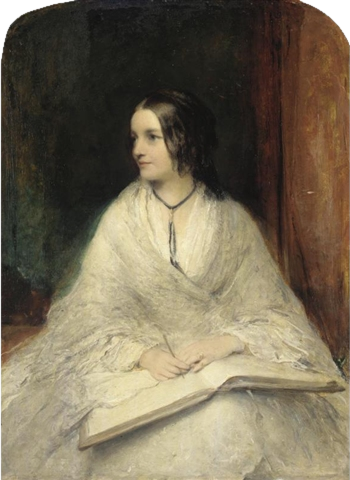
Jane Fortescue Seymour c. 1855 by William Boxall

On 11 August 1846, Coleridge married Jane Fortescue Seymour, daughter of the Rev. George Turner Seymour of Freshwater, Isle of Wight, herself an accomplished artist who notably painted John Henry Newman. A short notice of her by Dean Church of St Paul's was published in The Guardian, and was reprinted in her husband's privately printed collection of poems. They had three sons and a daughter:

- Mildred Mary Coleridge (1847–1929), married Charles Warren Adams
- Bernard John Seymour Coleridge (1851–1927), Liberal MP and judge of the High Court, succeeded as 2nd Baron Coleridge
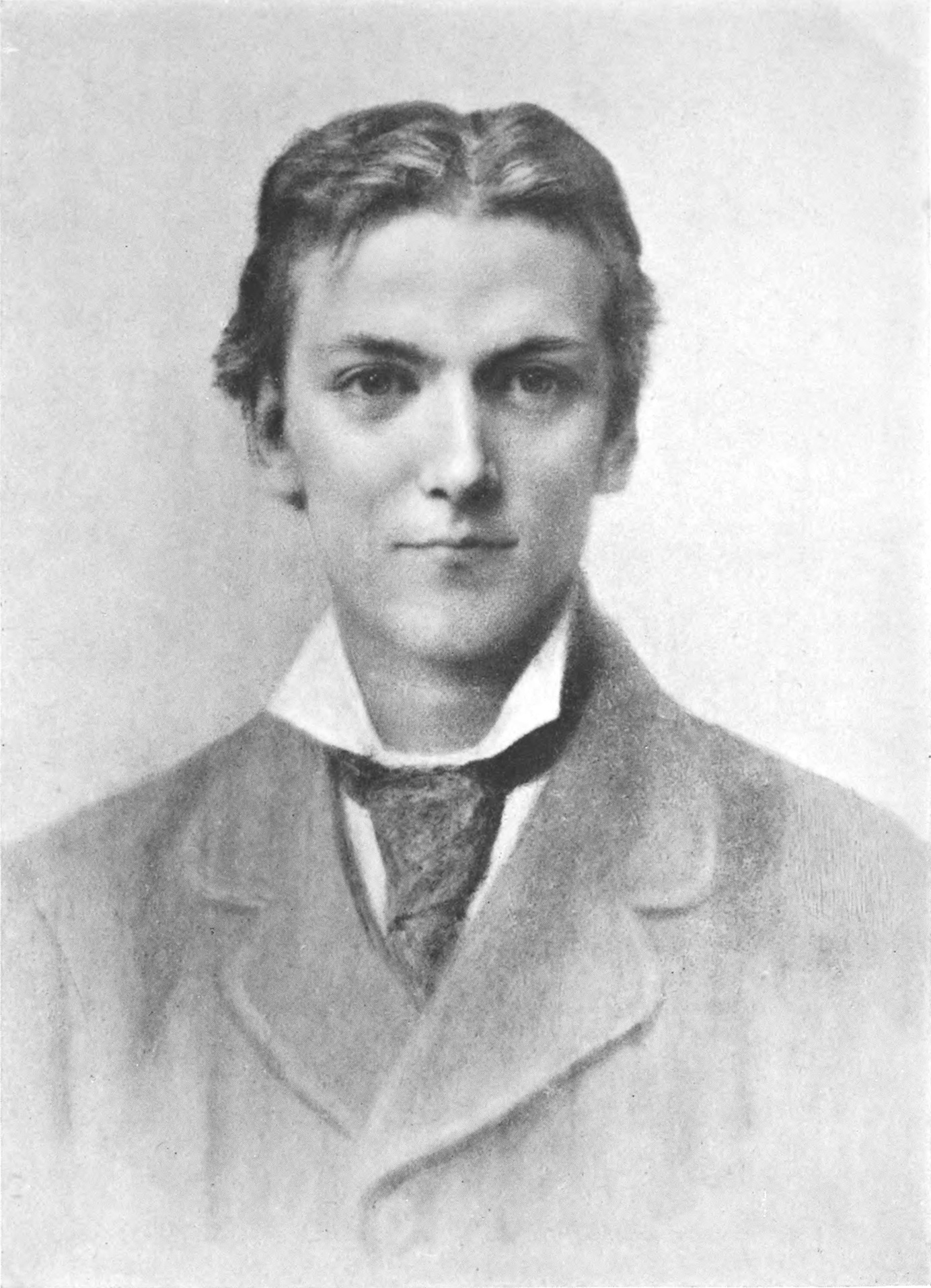
- Stephen Coleridge c. 1873 by Jane Seymour Coleridge
  Stephen William Buchanan Coleridge (1854–1936), barrister, author and landscape artist
- Gilbert James Duke Coleridge (1859–1953), barrister and sculptor

His first wife died on 6 February 1878. He remained a widower until 13 August 1885, when he married Amy Augusta Jackson Lawford, daughter of Henry Baring Lawford, who survived him.

When Coleridge's daughter Mildred went to live with the lawyer Charles Warren Adams – they married in 1885, Lord Coleridge refusing to attend the wedding – the family considered the match inappropriate. Mildred's brother Bernard wrote her a letter disparaging Adams as a fortune hunter, which prompted Adams to sue for libel. The resultant legal proceedings in November 1884 and November 1886 were highly embarrassing for Lord Coleridge, who was obliged as Lord Chief Justice to appear in the court of which he was the senior judge.

== Leading cases and judgments ==
- R v Coney (1882)
- R v Dudley and Stephens (1884)
- Gordon-Cumming v Wilson and Others (1891), the trial arising from the Royal Baccarat Scandal.

== Arms ==
Coat of arms of John Coleridge, 1st Baron Coleridge
| Crest A crucifix Or rising from an otter as in the arms. Escutcheon Argent on a mount Vert in base an otter Proper; a chief Gules charged with a dove of the field between two crosses patée fitchée Or. Supporters Dexter an otter Proper, gorged with a garland of roses Gules leaved Vert, sinister a lion sable gorged as the former. |

Parliament of the United Kingdom
| Preceded by Richard Sommers Gard; Viscount Courtenay | Member of Parliament for Exeter; 1865–1873; With: Viscount Courtenay 1865–1868; Edgar Alfred Bowring 1868–1873 | Succeeded by Edgar Alfred Bowring; Arthur Mills |
Political offices
| Preceded by Sir Richard Baggallay | Solicitor General; 1868–1871 | Succeeded by Sir George Jessel |
| Preceded by Sir Robert Collier | Attorney General; 1871–1873 | Succeeded by Sir Henry James |
Legal offices
| Preceded by Sir William Bovill | Chief Justice of the Common Pleas; 1873–1880 | Succeeded by (office abolished) |
| Preceded by Sir Alexander Cockburn | Lord Chief Justice of England; 1880–1894 | Succeeded by Lord Russell of Killowen |
Peerage of the United Kingdom
| New creation | Baron Coleridge; 1874–1894 | Succeeded by Bernard John Seymour Coleridge |
