= Christmas Tale =

Christmas Tale may refer to:

- A Christmas Tale (2008 French film) Un conte de Noël, a comedy-drama film
- Christmas Tales (2012 Norwegian album), Christmas album by Alexander Rybak
- The Country Mouse and the City Mouse: A Christmas Tale (1993 TV show)
- Rare Exports: A Christmas Tale (2010 film)
- Charlie Brown's Christmas Tales (2002 TV show)
- A Christmas Tale, a book in the Geronimo Stilton: Special Edition series

== See also ==
- Bugs Bunny's Looney Christmas Tales
- Christmas Tail (disambiguation)
- Christmas (disambiguation)
- Tale (disambiguation)
- Christmas Story (disambiguation)
- Christmas Miracle (disambiguation)
