= Joyeux Noël =

2005 film by Christian Carion

Merry Christmas
- Theatrical release poster
- Directed by: Christian Carion
- Written by: Christian Carion
- Produced by: Christophe Rossignon; Benjamin Herrmann
- Starring: Benno Fürmann; Guillaume Canet; Daniel Brühl; Diane Kruger; Gary Lewis; Alex Ferns
- Cinematography: Walther Vanden Ende
- Edited by: Judith Rivière Kawa; Andrea Sedlácková
- Music by: Philippe Rombi
- Distributed by: UGC Distribution (France); Senator Film (Germany); Sony Pictures Classics (through Columbia TriStar Film Distributors International; United Kingdom); Big Bang Media (Belgium); Media Pro Pictures (Romania)
- Release date: 9 November 2005
- Running time: 116 minutes
- Countries: France; Germany; United Kingdom; Belgium; Romania; Japan
- Languages: French; English; German
- Budget: $22 million
- Box office: $17.7—23.1 million

Joyeux Noël means Merry Christmas in French. For other uses, see Christmas (disambiguation) and Merry Christmas (disambiguation)

Joyeux Noël (English: Merry Christmas) is a 2005 war drama film based on the Christmas truce of December 1914, depicted through the eyes of French, British, and German soldiers. It was written and directed by Christian Carion, and screened out of competition at the 2005 Cannes Film Festival.

The film, which includes one of the last appearances of Ian Richardson before his death, was nominated for Best Foreign Language Film at the 78th Academy Awards. It is a fictionalised account of an actual event that took place in December 1914, when Wilhelm, German Crown Prince, sent the lead singer of the Berlin Imperial Opera company on a solo visit to the front line. Singing by the tenor, Walter Kirchhoff, to the 120th and 124th Württemberg regiments led Scottish soldiers in their trenches to stand up and applaud.

== Plot ==
The story focuses on the experiences of six people in the First World War: Gordon (a Lieutenant of the Royal Scots Fusiliers); Audebert (a French Lieutenant in the 26th Infantry and reluctant son of a general); Horstmayer (a Jewish German Lieutenant of the 93rd Infantry); Father Palmer (a Scottish priest working as a chaplain and stretcher-bearer); and two famous opera stars, German tenor Nikolaus Sprink (based on Walter Kirchhoff) and his Danish fiancée, mezzo-soprano Anna Sørensen.

The film begins with schoolboys reciting patriotic speeches praising their countries and condemning their enemies. Two Scottish brothers, Jonathan and William, enlist in the army, joined by their priest, Father Palmer, who becomes a chaplain. In Germany, Sprink is interrupted during an opera performance by an officer announcing a reserve call up. French soldier Audebert looks at a photograph of his pregnant wife, who is in the occupied part France, then joins his unit for a massive French-English assault on the German lines. The attack fails with heavy casualties and William is killed.

Anna and Sprink perform for Crown Prince Wilhelm. Sprink expresses bitterness at the comfort of the generals at their headquarters and resolves to go back to the front to sing for the troops and Anna decides to follow him. An unofficial Christmas truce begins in the trenches when the Scots sing festive songs accompanied by bagpipes. Sprink, with Sørensen arrive in the German front line, sings "Silent Night". Father Palmer joins him on his bagpipes from the Scottish front line. Sprink exits his trench with a small Christmas tree, singing "Adeste Fideles". Audebert, Horstmayer, and Gordon converge on him in no-man's-land and agree on a cease-fire.

Soldiers exit the trenches to wish each other "Joyeux Noël", "Frohe Weihnachten", and "Merry Christmas". They exchange chocolate, champagne, and photographs of loved ones. Horstmayer gives Audebert back his wallet containing a photograph of his wife, which was lost in the attack a few days prior, and share reminiscences. Father Palmer celebrates a brief Latin Mass for the soldiers. Jonathan, grieving for his brother, remains unmoved by the events around him.

The following morning, the lieutenants agree to extend the truce to allow each side to bury their dead. They spend the day fraternising and playing football. Audebert and Horstmayer talk in French of memories of Paris and Lens, and their families. Horstmayer offers to take a letter home to Audebert's wife. When German shells begin to fall, Horstmayer offers to shelter the French and British soldiers in his trench. Audebert and Gordon do the same to protect the Germans from their side's retaliatory artillery fire. Before parting, aware that the truce has now truly ended, Audebert and Horstmayer lament they can't be friends, and hope they both survive the war. Audebert compliments Horstmayer on his French, and the German reveals his wife is French. Horstmayer learns that Anna and Sprink are at the front without permission and warns Sprink he'll be arrested. As the Germans regain their trenches, Anna and Sprink remain behind and ask Audebert to take them captive to avoid separation.

Anna surrenders letters given to her for delivery to families in Berlin, and with many other letters from the French, British and German soldiers, the military authorities discover the truce had occurred. Father Palmer is discharged back to his parish and his battalion is disbanded in shame. He's rebuked by the bishop, who preaches an anti-German sermon to new recruits, urging them to kill every wicked German they can. Father Palmer overhears the sermon and removes his cross as he leaves.

An English major, angered by the truce, orders the Scots to shoot a German crossing no-man's-land toward them. The soldiers deliberately miss until Jonathan, still bitter, kills him. Audebert discovers the soldier is a disguised Ponchel, his batman. With his dying words, Ponchel reveals he gained help from the German soldiers, visited his mother, and had coffee with her. He also learns his wife has given birth to a boy named Henri.

Audebert is sent to Verdun as punishment, and when he is dressed down by his father, a general, he responds he has no remorse for the fraternisation and feels disgust for civilians and superiors who talk of sacrifice but know nothing of the struggle in the trenches. When he tells the general he has a French grandson, the general relents, and suggests they "both try and survive this war for him".

Horstmayer and his troops, confined to a train, are informed by the German Crown Prince they are to be shipped directly to the Eastern Front without leave. He stomps on Jörg's harmonica and says Horstmayer doesn't deserve his Iron Cross. As the train departs, the Germans hum the carol they learnt from the Scots.

== Cast ==
- Benno Fürmann (singing voice: Rolando Villazón) as Private Nikolaus Sprink (German tenor) real name Walter Kirchhoff (Berlín;1879 — Wiesbaden; 1951)
- Guillaume Canet as Lieutenant Camille René Audebert (French 26th Infantry Regiment)
- Diane Kruger (singing voice: Natalie Dessay) as Anna Sørensen (Danish soprano, Sprink's wife)
- Gary Lewis as Father Palmer (Scottish priest and stretcher-bearer)
- Alex Ferns as Lieutenant Gordon (Scots Fusiliers)
- Dany Boon as Private Ponchel (Audebert's batman)
- Daniel Brühl as Leutnant (Lieutenant) Horstmayer (German 93rd Infantry Regiment)
- Christian Carion as British Medical Orderly
- Christopher Fulford as Royal Scots Fusiliers Major
- Mathias Herrmann as German Officer at Headquarters
- Neil McNulty as Scottish Soldier
- Lucas Belvaux as Gueusselin
- Steven Robertson as Jonathan
- Suzanne Flon as The Chatelaine
- Bernard Le Coq as Général
- Ian Richardson as the Bishop
- Thomas Schmauser as the Crown Prince

== Development and production ==
Carion's youth was spent in his parents' farm fields in Northern France, where he was constantly reminded of World War I as the family often found dangerous unexploded shells left over from the conflicts in the fields. He had also heard of the stories in which French soldiers would leave their trenches at night to meet with their wives in the surrounding German-occupied towns and return to fight the next morning. Carion stated that he had never heard of the actual Christmas truce incidents while growing up in France, as the French Army and authorities suppressed them, having been viewed as an act of disobedience. He was introduced to the stories via a historian who showed him photos and documents archived in France, the United Kingdom, and Germany, and became fascinated. He tried to portray all of the soldiers with equal sympathy, as "the people on the frontline can understand each other because they are living the same life and suffering the same way", so he could understand how the truce could have come about. He endeavored to stay true to the real stories, but one of the things he had to change was the fate of the cat that crossed into various trenches. In reality, the cat was accused of spying, arrested by the French Army and then shot by a firing squad, as an actual traitor would have been. The extras in the movie refused to participate in this scene, so it was amended to have the cat imprisoned.

== Adaptations ==
Kevin Puts' 2011 opera Silent Night is based on the Joyeux Noël screenplay.

== Soundtrack ==
- "Ave Maria", performed by Natalie Dessay, The London Symphony Orchestra
- "Bist du bei mir", performed by Natalie Dessay and Rolando Villazón
- "I'm Dreaming of Home", performed by Griogair Lawrie, David Bruce, Ivan MacDonald and Calum Anthony Beaton (Bagpipe Ensemble)
- "The Braes of Killiecrankie", traditional
- Piobaireachd – "The Cloth of Gold", traditional
- "Piobaireachd of Donald Dubh", traditional
- "Silent Night"
- "Adeste Fideles", traditional, performed by Rolando Villazón (vocals), Griogair Lawrie (bagpipes)
- "Auld Lang Syne", Scottish traditional
- "L'Hymne des Fraternisés/I'm Dreaming of Home", performed by Scala & Kolacny Brothers, Natalie Dessay, The London Symphony Orchestra

== Reception ==
=== Critical response ===
Joyeux Noël has an approval rating of 74% on review aggregator website Rotten Tomatoes, based on 112 reviews, and an average rating of 6.8/10.The website's critical consensus states, "The poignant humanity on display in Joyeux Noël makes its sentimentality forgivable". Metacritic assigned the film a weighted average score of 70 out of 100, based on 26 critics, indicating "generally favorable reviews".

Stephen Holden, film critic for The New York Times, liked the motion picture and wrote, "If the film's sentiments about the madness of war are impeccably high-minded, why then does Joyeux Noël ...feel as squishy and vague as a handsome greeting card declaring peace on earth? Maybe it's because the kind of wars being fought in the 21st century involve religious, ideological and economic differences that go much deeper and feel more resistant to resolution than the European territorial disputes and power struggles that precipitated World War I... Another reason is that the movie's cross-section of soldiers from France, Scotland and Germany are so scrupulously depicted as equal-opportunity peacemakers that they never come fully to life as individuals."

Critic Roger Ebert also wrote about the sentimentality of the film, "Joyeux Noël has its share of bloodshed, especially in a deadly early charge, but the movie is about a respite from carnage, and it lacks the brutal details of films like Paths of Glory ...Its sentimentality is muted by the thought that this moment of peace actually did take place, among men who were punished for it, and who mostly died soon enough afterward. But on one Christmas, they were able to express what has been called, perhaps too optimistically, the brotherhood of man."

=== Awards ===
Award	Category	Recipient	Result
Academy Awards	Best Foreign Language Film of the Year		Nominated
BAFTA Film Award	Best Film not in the English Language	Christophe Rossignon and Christian Carion	Nominated
César Awards	Best Film		Nominated
César Awards	Best Supporting Actor	Dany Boon	Nominated
César Awards	Best Original Screenplay	Christian Carion	Nominated
César Awards	Best Original Music	Philippe Rombi	Nominated
César Awards	Best Costume Design	Alison Forbes-Meyler	Nominated
César Awards	Best Production Design	Jean-Michel Simonet	Nominated
Golden Globes	Best Foreign Language Film		Nominated
Leeds International Film Festival	Audience Award		Won
Leeds International Film Festival	Best Feature	Christian Carion	Won
Valladolid International Film Festival	Critics' Award		Won

== See also ==
- List of Christmas films
- List of association football films
- List of submissions to the 78th Academy Awards for Best Foreign Language Film
- List of French submissions for the Academy Award for Best Foreign Language Film
