= Tale =

Tale may refer to:

- Narrative, or story, a report of real or imaginary connected events
- TAL effector (TALE), a type of DNA binding protein
- Tale, Albania, a resort town
- Tale, Iran, a village
- Tale, Maharashtra, a village in Ratnagiri district, Maharashtra state, India
- River Tale, a small river in the English county of Devon
- The Tale, 2018 American drama film
- The Tale (short story), a 1917 short story by Joseph Conrad

== See also ==
- Tale-e Rudbar, a village in Iran
- Taleh, a town in Somalia
- Tales (disambiguation)
