= Mary Christmas =

Mary Christmas may refer to:

- Mary Christmas (album), a 1965 album by Eddie Fisher
- Mary Christmas (editor), editor of the magazine $pread
- Mary Christmas (film), a 2002 American Christmas movie

== See also ==
- A Mary Christmas, a 2013 album by Mary J. Blige
- Merry Christmas (disambiguation)
