= Tales =

Tales may refer to:

== Arts and entertainment ==
- Tales (album), a 1995 album by Marcus Miller
- Tales (film), a 2014 Iranian film
- Tales (TV series), an American television series
- Tales (video game), a 2016 point-and-click adventure game
- Tales (video game series), a series of role-playing games
- "Tales", or "Tales from the Forest of Gnomes", a song by Wolfmother from Wolfmother
- "Tales", a song by Schoolboy Q from Crash Talk

== People ==
- Rémi Talès (born 1984), French rugby union player
- Tales Schütz, Brazilian footballer

== Other uses ==
- Tales, Castellón, a municipality in Spain

== See also ==
- Star Wars Tales, an animated anthology series
- Tale (disambiguation)
- Nürtingen–Neuffen railway, also known as the Tälesbahn, in Baden-Württemberg in Germany
