= Christmas (surname) =

Christmas is an uncommon English-language surname. The origin is uncertain; some genealogy books state that it was given to people born near Christmas, while this is disputed by researchers, and DNA tests performed on men with the surname show that the majority of those descend from a common ancestor. Others suggest it was given to people who organised Christmas festivities, or has a Norman origin. Most prominent in Southern England, various notable people from around the world have had the surname, and it has been given to a number of fictional characters. The William Faulkner character Joe Christmas, from Light in August, has a much-discussed name. The blood disorder Christmas disease or haemophilia B was first described in (and named for) a boy with the surname and is observed in other people of the name.

== Etymology ==
The linguistic etymology of the English word "Christmas" is from Middle English "Crīstes mæsse", referring to the mass of (Jesus) Christ; the word "Crīstes" comes from the Greek "Chrīstos", "Χριστός". The word "Christmas", used to denote the celebration of the nativity of Jesus on 25 December, appeared around the 12th century.

== Origin ==
There is no certain origin of Christmas as a surname. Some books state that the name was originally given to those born on or near Christmas, indicating "one born at Christmas", either directly as a surname or initially as a byname or given name which became a patronymic and then an inherited surname. Charles Wareing Endell Bardsley, writing in the 1870s, noted that Noel had been a common given name for boys born on Christmas, but as the French meaning became obscured in England, the name Christmas replaced it. By the 1990s, the given name Christmas had been replaced by Noel again, when used in this way. Bardsley did report finding record of a child named Christmas unrelated to the season: having the surname Day, his parents had given him the name to make him Christmas Day. Genealogical researcher Henry Christmas contends that the "one born at Christmas" proposal is "too easy" and does not make sense with the rareness and localization of the surname.

Records stating the "one born at Christmas" origin include A Dictionary of English and Welsh Surnames (1896) by Bardsley and Surnames of the United Kingdom (1912) by Henry Harrison. The earliest record of this origin is in Patronymica Britannica (1860) by Mark Antony Lower, which sources it to speculation by Tudor historian William Camden, stating: "CHRISTMAS, CHRISMAS. Originally imposed, Camden thinks, as a baptismal name, in consequence of the individual having been born on the day of the festival."

In 2005, geneticists in Oxford led by Bryan Sykes found that, of a selection of men with the surname, 70% were descended from one 13th-century Yorkshireman. Henry Christmas traced lineage of the surname; spelt "Chrystmasse" in the earliest records he found, he suggested that it is Norman in origin. In The Norman People and Their Existing Descendants in the British Dominions and the United States of America (1874), published by Henry Samuel King, the surname is said to be a direct translation of the French surname Noel.

The Dictionary of American Family Names (2003) by Patrick Hanks notes two origins of the surname: given to someone with a relation to Christmas, e.g. a leader of festivities, and a translation of French Noel.

== History ==
The name is principally found in Essex and Sussex counties in England; in Henry B. Guppy's 1890 Homes of Family Names in Great Britain it is described as an "ancient name" in this area, also present in Cambridgeshire, surviving into the 13th century as "Cristemasse". Guppy notes that John Crystmasse was a nobleman of the area in 1433. The name has been recorded with spellings "Cristemass" in 1185 and 1191, and "Cristesmesse" in 1308. The Norman People notes a Richard Christmasse in c.1272. Hanks also noted the name as pertaining to Southern England, but found an established family in County Waterford, Ireland, in 1622.

During the time of James I, Gerard or Garrett Christmas and his sons, John and Matthew, were involved in producing entertainment. They were trained carvers but, thanks to their craft, also staged the Lord Mayor's Show annual pageants for the Lord Mayor of London, with royal approval. Their positions cumulatively lasted for twenty-one years, and their work was well-respected. In the 17th century, a Thomas Christmas was a trumpeter in Charles II's court; he and another Christmas from Waterford have their names written as "Christmas" in a royal record printed in 1691, while the celebration itself is written with the spelling "Christmass". A different Thomas Christmas, whose will was dated 1520, was a merchant and major philanthropist in Colchester.

In the 20th century, William Herbert Turner compiled two volumes of Christmas families based in South Carolina and the East Coast of the United States.

=== Christmas disease ===
The blood disorder haemophilia B is also known as Christmas disease, named after Stephen Christmas, the first patient described with the condition; the Journal of Haemophilia Practice said that Stephen Christmas's parents, in naming him Stephen and his brother Robin with the surname Christmas, had a sense of humour. Other men named Christmas have been found to have the condition, which is inherited. A deficiency of Factor IX, or: the Christmas factor, also named for Stephen Christmas, causes Christmas disease. The condition was first published in a journal at Christmas, leading some to assume it was offensively named for the holiday and demand its name be changed. As a result, the condition is now formally known as haemophilia B.

== Notable people with the surname Christmas ==
- Art Christmas (1905–1961), Canadian jazz saxophonist
- Cecil Christmas (1886–1916), English footballer
- Celestina Christmas (1827–1859), English murderer (as Celestina Sommer)
- Dani Christmas (born 1987), British racing cyclist and former runner
- David Christmas (born 1969), English cricketer
- Demarcus Christmas (born 1995), American football player
- Dionte Christmas (born 1986), American professional basketball player
- Edward A. Christmas (1903–1969), American horse trainer
- Eric Christmas (1916–2000), British actor
- Ernest William Christmas (1863–1918), Australian painter
- George R. Christmas (born 1940), American Marine Corps general
- Henry Christmas (1811–1868), English Anglican priest
- Jarred Christmas (born c. 1980), New Zealand-born British comedian
- John Christmas (born 1969), American former banker and writer
- Johnny Christmas (born 1982), lacrosse player for Philadelphia Wings
- Julie Christmas (born 1975), American heavy metal singer
- Karima Christmas-Kelly (born 1989), American female professional basketball player
- Keith Christmas (1946–2026), English singer songwriter
- Lee Christmas (1863–1924), American mercenary
- Mary Christmas, American magazine editor
- Rakeem Christmas (born 1991), American college basketball player
- Randy Christmas (1920–1969), Mayor of Miami, Florida
- Robert Christmas (1924–2000), Canadian rower
- Ruth Christmas (1904–2001), English middle-distance runner
- Stephen Christmas (1947–1993), for whom the blood clotting protein Factor IX was named
- Steve Christmas (born 1957), American Major League Baseball player
- Sydnie Christmas (born 1995), English singer and actress
- William Christmas (Kilmallock MP) (1734–1803), Irish politician, MP for Kilmallock 1776–1783
- William Christmas (Waterford MP) (1798–1867), Irish politician, Conservative Party MP for Waterford City
- William Whitney Christmas (1895–1960), American aviation pioneer and designer of the Christmas Bullet aircraft

== Fictional characters with the name Christmas ==
- Joe Christmas (see below), a character in William Faulkner's novel Light in August
- Lee Christmas, played by Jason Statham, a member of the Expendables in the movie franchise of the same name
- Lloyd Christmas, played by Jim Carrey, one of the main characters in the Dumb and Dumber movie franchise
- Miss Merry Christmas, member of Baroque Works from the manga series One Piece
- Rev. Tom Christmas, protagonist of C. C. Benison's Father Christmas Mystery series of books
- The Christmas family in 2021 holiday movie Father Christmas Is Back
- An unseen character named U.S. Christmas is referred to in the 1973 movie, Pat Garrett and Billy the Kid

=== Joe Christmas ===
Faulkner's character of Joe Christmas has a lot of his identity based on his name. The name had been given to him when he was left at an orphanage on Christmas, but he claims it over the surname of his foster father. Scholarly researcher Owen Robinson wrote that "the self represented by the name "Christmas" is the very core of Joe's largely inarticulate being"; he quoted Alfred Kazin stating that, because of its lack of personal identity, the name Joe Christmas "is worse than any real name could be". Robinson argues that choosing to claim a lack of identity embodies the character's approach to matters, and this plays an important role in driving the narrative. The story also contains racial conflict, with Joe Christmas's ambiguity a main issue; again, his name is used to define him, when another character asks "Did you ever hear of a white man named Christmas?" on page twenty-nine. There is also religious conflict, with Joe Christmas's foster father at one point describing his surname as sacrilegious. Some scholars have compared Joe Christmas to Jesus Christ.

== See also ==
- Christmas (disambiguation)
- Christ (surname)
- List of mayors of Waterford, several of whom were named Christmas
- Surnames which mean "Christmas" in other languages:
  - Božić
  - Di Natale
  - Juhl
