= Christmas Miracle =

Christmas Miracle, Miracle at Christmas, Miracle of Christmas, may refer to:

== Film and television ==
- The Small One, a 1978 Disney animated short also released as "A Christmas Miracle"
- "A Christmas Miracle", a 1983 episode of Terrahawks
- Miracle at Christmas: Ebbie's Story, a 1995 telemovie based on Charles Dickens' "A Christmas Carol"
- A Christmas Miracle, a 2008 documentary about the 1965 animated telefilm A Charlie Brown Christmas
- The Christmas Miracle (Russian: Рождественская мистерия, romanized: Rozhdestvenskaya misteriya, lit. 'Christmas mystery'), a 2000 Russian drama film
- Miracle of Christmas, a 2010 documentary narrated by Kim Nam-joo (actress)
- "The Christmas Miracle" (Japanese: クリスマスの奇跡, romanized: Kurisumasu no Kiseki, lit. 'Miracle of Christmas'), 2012 episode 16 of tokusatsu TV show Kamen Rider Wizard (Japanese: 仮面ライダーウィザード, romanized: Kamen Raidā Wizādo)
- "A Christmas Miracle", 2014 episode 33 of South Korean reality TV show Roommate (TV program)
- "Christmas Miracle" (Japanese: クリスマスの奇跡, romanized: Kurisumasu no Kiseki}, lit. 'Miracle of Christmas'), a 2006 episode of Bartender (Japanese: バーテンダー, romanized: Bātendā)
- A Christmas Miracle, a 2015 telefilm starring Maeve Quinlan
- "The Christmas Miracle", 2016 episode 162 of South Korean reality TV show The Return of Superman
- "A Christmas Miracle", 2017 season 9 episode 10 of TV show The Middle season 9
- "A Christmas Miracle", 2018 episode 8 of TV show Younger season 5
- "A Christmas Miracle", 2018 episode 698 of technology punditry webseries This Week in Tech
- "The Miracle of Christmas", 2018 two-part finale episode of TV show Timeless (TV series)
- A Christmas Miracle, a 2019 telefilm directed by Tibor Takács (director); a Hallmark Channel Original Movie
- Debbie Macomber's A Christmas Miracle, a 2021 telefilm starring Roark Critchlow
- "A Christmas Miracle: The Madrid Family Story", a 2022 episode 50 of TV show Magpakailanman (MPK; Tagalog: Forevermore)
- 'Miracles of Christmas', a programming segment on U.S. TV network Hallmark Mystery

== Literature ==
- A Christmas Miracle, a 1996 multi-author anthology with Stephanie Mittman, Katherine Kingsley, Virginia Henley, Rebecca Paisley
- Christmas Miracles, a 1996 multi-author anthology with Carole Mortimer, Betty Neels, Rebecca Winters
- "The Christmas Miracle", a 1999 story by Robert Keith Leavitt
- Shaoey and Dot: The Christmas Miracle, a 2005 children's book by Steven Curtis Chapman
- "The Christmas Miracle", a 2013 short story by Rebecca Curtis
- Christmas Miracles, a 2015 anthology by Mary Balogh
- "The Miracle of Christmas", a book by James W. Moore (author)

== Music ==
- 'Miracles of Christmas', a 1959 choral by Ned Rorem
- The Miracle of Christmas, a 1972 album by Anita Bryant
- The Miracle of Christmas, a 2000 album by Pat Boone
- "The Miracles of Christmas", a 1966 song by Stevie Wonder off the single Someday at Christmas
- The Miracle of Christmas, a 2005 double album by Neil Sedaka
- "The Miracle of Christmas", a 2005 song by Steven Curtis Chapman off the album All I Really Want for Christmas
- "The Miracle of Christmas", a song by Funeral for a Friend featured in the 2005 film The Ice Harvest
- "The Christmas Miracle" (Korean: 성탄절의 기적, romanized: Seongtanjeolui Gijeok), a 2014 song by Seo Taiji off the album Quiet Night (album)
- "The Miracle of Christmas", a 2014 song by Michael W. Smith off the album The Spirit of Christmas
- "The Miracle Of Christmas" (Korean: 크라스마스 기적, romanized: Keuliseumaseu Gijeog, lit. 'Christmas Miracle'), a 2022 song and single by Lee Su-jeong
- "Coming Off the Snow (The Miracle of Christmas)", a 2022 single by Olly Murs
- "The Miracle of Christmas", a song by Victor Wood

== Stage and theatre ==
- A Christmas Miracle, a 1958 opera by Mark Fax
- The Christmas Miracle (Czech: Vánoční zázrak aneb Sliby se maj plnit o Vánocích, lit. 'Christmas Miracle or Promises Should Be Fulfilled at Christmas'), a 2011 musical by Janek Ledecký; see List of musicals by composer: A to L
- The Miracle of Christmas, a stageplay produced by Sight & Sound Theatres

== Other uses ==
- Hungnam evacuation also called the "Miracle of Christmas", a 1950 evacuation of Hungnam by U.N. troops and North Korean civilians during the Korean War
- 2015 December 24 NFL game dubbed "The Christmas Miracle"; see History of the Cleveland Browns

== See also ==
- Milagros de Navidad (Spanish: Christmas Miracles), a 2017 U.S. TV series on Telemundo
- Christmas Night Miracle, a 2006 novel by Carole Mortimer
- "The Miracle of Christmas Night" (Japanese: 奇跡はクリスマスの夜に, romanized: Kiseki wa Kurisumasu no Yoru ni), a 2019 episode of the tokusatsu TV show Ultraman Taiga
- "Miracle of Christmas Eve" (Japanese: 聖夜の奇跡, romanized: Seiya no Kiseki), a 2006 episode 8 of Hell Girl
- A Christmas Eve Miracle, a 2015 film by Steven Paul
- All pages with titles containing "Christmas" and "Miracle"
- Christmas (disambiguation)
- Miracle (disambiguation)
- Christmas Tale (disambiguation)
- Christmas Story (disambiguation)
