= Christmas Tail =

Christmas Tail or Tail of Christmas, may refer to:

- "A Christmas Tail" (The Bellflower Bunnies), a 2004 season 2 episode of animated TV show The Bellflower Bunnies
- A Christmas Tail (2012 film), a direct-to-video film
- A Christmas Tail, a 2014 Christmas panto by the Weirdos Comedy Club
- "A Christmas Tail", a 2015 story by Lynn Ames
- "A Christmas Tail", a 2015 short story by JG Faherty
- Tails of Christmas, a 2024 telefilm aired by Great American Family TV network

== See also ==
- All pages with titles containing "Christmas" and "Tail"
- Christmas (disambiguation)
- Tail (disambiguation)
- Christmas Tale (disambiguation)
