= Christmas Story =

Christmas Story, A Christmas Story, or The Christmas Story may refer to:

- Nativity of Jesus in Christianity

== Film ==
- A Christmas Story, a 1983 comedy film based on the anecdotes of Jean Shepherd
  - A Christmas Story: The Musical, a 2012 musical version of the 1983 film A Christmas Story
  - A Christmas Story Live!, a 2017 live musical television program inspired by the 1983 film A Christmas Story
- A Christmas Story Christmas, a 2022 sequel to the 1983 film
- Christmas Story (film) (Joulutarina), a 2007 Finnish Christmas drama film

== Television ==
- The Homecoming: A Christmas Story, a 1971 television film that acted as the pilot for the series The Waltons
- A Christmas Story (1972 TV special), a 1972 animated short produced by Hanna-Barbera
- The Gift of Love: A Christmas Story, a 1983 television film starring Lee Remick, Angela Lansbury and Polly Holliday
- "A Christmas Story" (Lassie)
- "The Christmas Story" (The Andy Griffith Show)
- "The Christmas Story" (Dragnet)

== Literature ==
=== Collections ===
- Christmas Stories, an 1823 collection by Edward Berens
- Christmas Stories, an 1868 collection by Charles Dickens
- Christmas Stories, an 1884 collection by Mary Jane Holmes
- Christmas Stories, a 1916 collection by Georgene Faulkner
- Christmas Stories, a 1923 collection by Jacob A. Riis

=== Standalone works ===
- Ginèvra; or, The Old Oak Chest: A Christmas Story, an 1887 novel by Susan Wallace
- Partners for Life: A Christmas Story, an 1847 novel by Camilla Dufour Crosland
- Rosemary: A Christmas Story, a 1906 novel by C. N. and A. M. Williamson
- Shadows on the Snow: A Christmas Story, an 1865 novel by Benjamin Farjeon
- The Angel Doll: A Christmas Story, a 1996 novel by Jerry Bledsoe
- The Burglar and the Blizzard: A Christmas Story, a 1914 novel by Alice Duer Miller
- The Snow Storm: A Christmas Story, an 1845 novel by Catherine Gore
- The Story of Zephyr: A Christmas Story, a 1917 children's novel by Jeanie Oliver Davidson Smith

== Music ==
- Christmas Story (Schütz), a 1660 composition
- A Christmas Story – An Axe, an Apple and a Buckskin Jacket, a 1957 album by Bing Crosby
- A Christmas Story (Point of Grace album), a 1999 album by Point of Grace
- A Christmas Story, 45-minute pop cantata by Anita Kerr and a 1971 album

== See also ==
- "Simpsons Christmas Stories", a 2005 episode of The Simpsons
- A Christmas Carol (disambiguation)
- Christmas Tale (disambiguation)
- Christmas Miracle (disambiguation)
