= Tales (video game) =

2016 video game

- Developer: Ape Marina
- Publisher: Screen 7 Entertainment
- Engine: Adventure Game Studio
- Platforms: Windows, Linux
- Release: Windows, Linux: WW: November 14, 2016
- Genre: Graphic adventure
- Mode: Single-player

Tales is a graphic adventure developed by Ape Marina and published by Screen 7. The game was released DRM-free on Steam, Humble Bundle and GOG for Microsoft Windows and Linux on November 14, 2016. Tales is a 2D point-and-click fantasy game in which stages are based on myths, legends, and fairy-tale books.

Since its release, it has been met with mostly positive reviews. Reviewers praised the story, puzzles, voice-acting, and humor, noting it's great to play something suitable for the whole family.

== Gameplay ==
Each stage takes place within a different book. The player can move from one book to another in a non-linear way. The goal is to progress the main quest by solving puzzles, riddles, and mini-games in each of the specific books.

Central to Tales is the magic bell item. This is a magical item that allows you to travel from book to book and is available in all stories. When the player travels into a new book, he leaves behind everything he had in the library and builds a new inventory unique to that tale. The player can return to earlier books and replay them, possibly progressing the main quest.

== Plot ==
When mysterious darkness is released from a forbidden book inside the library that he has inherited in unknown circumstances, a young man named Alfred Walsh must venture into the stories that have become affected by its power, assisted by none other than the sorcerer Merlin from the legends of King Arthur. Developed by Ape Marina, a small development team inspired by the works of Sierra and Lucasarts, Tales is a point and click adventure that gives us a whole new way to experience some of the world's most treasured literature. Along with the many heroes that inhabit the books affected by the malevolent magic, Alfred must rely on his wits and puzzle-solving abilities to ensure that the darkness is vanquished, and the stories reach their intended endings.

=== Characters ===
Alfred Walsh, a young librarian, is the main protagonist of the story. He is voiced by British comedian and creator of Nelly Cootalot, Alasdair Beckett-King. All the other characters are based on legends like Merlin the Wizard, King Arthur and others from classic stories from Mesopotamian, Norse and Greek mythology.

- Merlin: The wizard from the legend of King Arthur acts as your guide to the literary worlds. Merlin is voiced by actor Dave Lanzafame.
- Urshanabi: The ferryman of the dead is voiced by actor Vincent van Ommen and is part of the Epic of Gilgamesh, in which he is a companion of Gilgamesh. His equivalent in Greek mythology is Charon.
- Loki: Is known as a trickster god. His origins are based in Norse mythology, in which he sometimes assists the gods and sometimes behaves maliciously towards them. Loki is voiced by Klemens Koehring.
- Thor: Thor is the hammer-wielding god associated with thunder, lightning, and storms. He's the protector of mankind. Thor is voiced by Jesse Lowther.

== Development ==
Tales was developed by Ape Marina, a small development team inspired by the works of Sierra and Lucasarts. The project was led by creators Andrea Ferrara and Giovanni Ottomano. Mark Lovegrove functioned as executive producer.

An early version of the game was awarded an AGS Award for Best Demo in 2014.

On November 4, 2016, the official launch trailer was released on YouTube. November 14, 2016, release date was announced in early October 2016.

== Soundtrack ==
The Tales – Original Videogame Soundtrack is created by musician Luigi Di Guida. Each tale within the game has its specific musical influence, from the renaissance, medieval to Arabic. The soundtrack contains 23 tracks with 50 minutes of original music and is available in MP3 format. A copy of the OST is included with each version of the game.

No.	Title	Composer	Length
1.	"Tales"	Luigi Di Guida	2:18
2.	"The Ancient Library"	Luigi Di Guida	2:04
3.	"The Curse of Oblivion"	Luigi Di Guida	2:24
4.	"A Curious Custodian"	Luigi Di Guida	2:14
5.	"City of Uruk"	Luigi Di Guida	2:55
6.	"Uruk Dungeon"	Luigi Di Guida	3:39
7.	"Pantagruel"	Luigi Di Guida	2:48
8.	"Mythical Action"	Luigi Di Guida	1:23
9.	"Jungle Suspense"	Luigi Di Guida	2:44
10.	"Popol Vuh"	Luigi Di Guida	2:44
11.	"The Pelota Challenge"	Luigi Di Guida	2:08
12.	"Tales Verse II"	Luigi Di Guida	1:54
13.	"Up the Beanstalk"	Luigi Di Guida	2:24
14.	"Merlin the Wizard"	Luigi Di Guida	2:31
Total length:			0:54:13

== Reception ==
Tales

Aggregate score
Aggregator	Score
GameRankings	80%

Review scores
Publication	Score
Testiversum	8.1/10
Adventure Gamers	4/5
ITC	4/5

Tales received mostly positive reviews from critics, with praise given to its humorous depiction of classic stories, its use of puzzles and its non-linear gameplay. Aggregating review website GameRankings rated the videogame at 80%. In 2017 the game was nominated for 7 AGS Awards, including Best Game Created with AGS, Best Gameplay, Best Puzzles, and Best Voice Acting.

AdventureGamers awarded it 4 out of 5, specifically praising the graphics and artwork, saying "Every pixel has been crafted with care, making for lush, detailed backgrounds and nicely animated characters". The review also praises the fun gameplay with the dialogue puzzles, minigames, and riddles, while noting the handling of the inventory can be quite frustrating at times. Despite small technical issues AdventureGamers recommendsTales, saying: "If you like myths and literature, meaty puzzles, or even just playing with Thor's hammer and Jack's beanstalk, this game comes heartily recommended".

FutureSack praised about the story-line and humor of Tales, writing: "There are plenty of jokes for all ages to enjoy" and "It's great to see something suitable for the whole family".

ITC scored the game 4 out of 5 stars, praising the mythological basis of the plot, non-linear gameplay, and voice-acting, saying "Tales is a recommendation to all fans of classic adventure games".

Testiversum scored the game 8.1/10, the reviewer wrote "Tales is a clear recommendation for all point-and-click friends. An interesting story, exciting gameplay, and challenging puzzles hide behind a slightly too typical sounding title", noting the technical aspects of the picture are slightly blocky and the resolution quite low.
