= Otterhead Lakes =

Group of lakes in Somerset, England

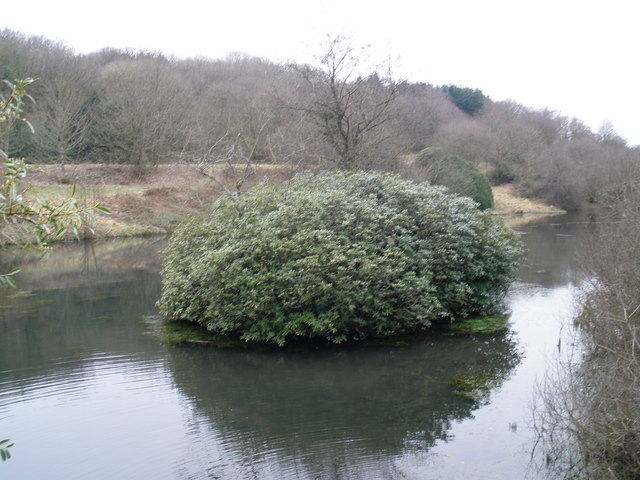

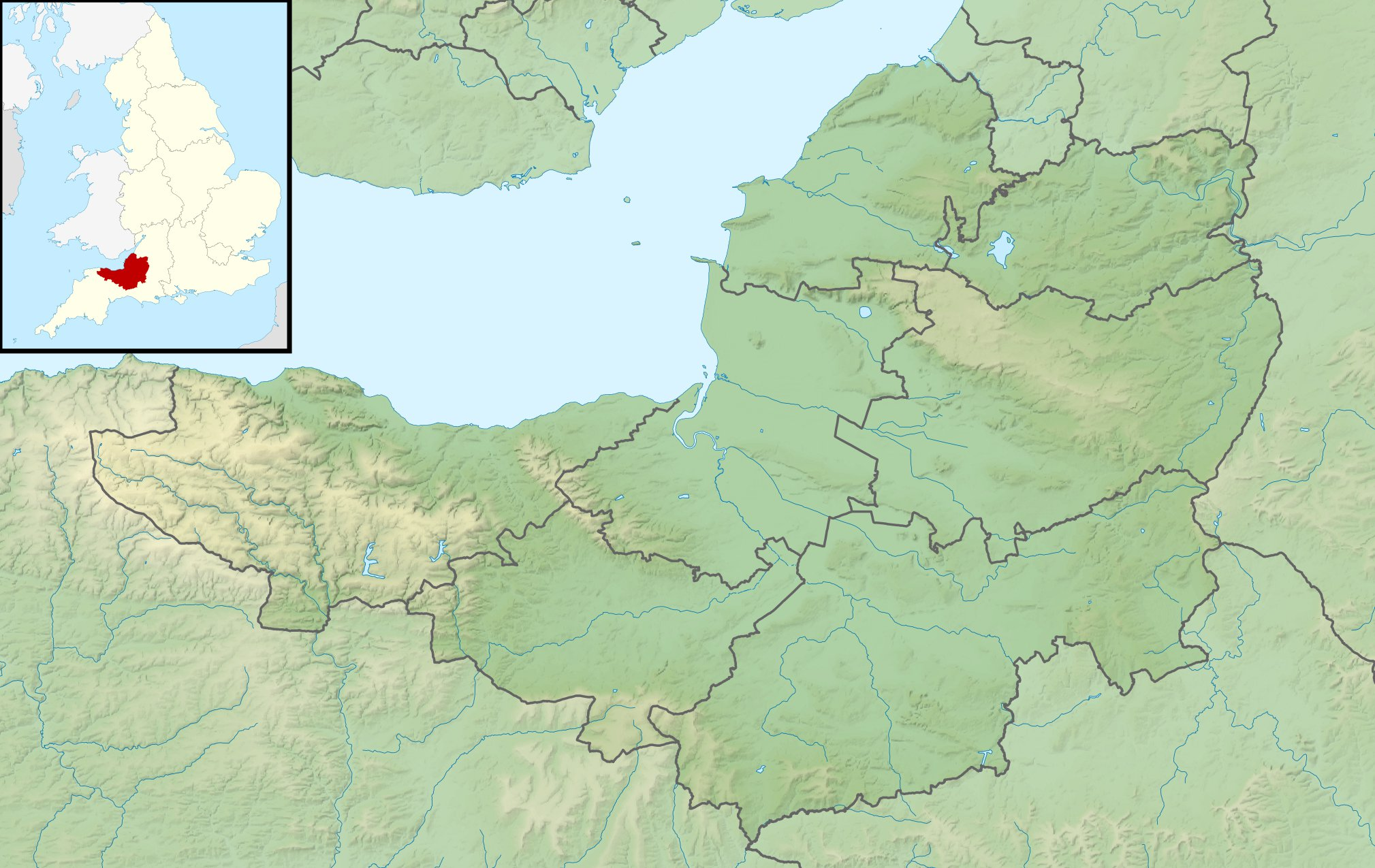
- Location within Somerset
- Location: Otterford, Somerset, England
- Coordinates: 50°55′08″N 3°06′16″W
- Primary inflows: River Otter
- Primary outflows: River Otter
- Built: 1850s

Otterhead Lakes are a pair of reservoirs in the Blackdown Hills Area of Outstanding Natural Beauty south of Otterford in Somerset, England. They are fed by the River Otter and managed by the Otterhead Estate Trust Company Limited, working with the Somerset Wildlife Trust on behalf of Wessex Water. They are a Local Nature Reserve.

The two lakes which remain are all that are left of a series of pools in the landscaped gardens of Otterhead House which was built in 1845 and demolished in 1952, and its surrounding estate developed by William Beadon. The lakes are the centrepiece of the one mile long Otterhead Local Nature Reserve which includes dry woodland which has a ground flora including common bluebell, dogs mercury and twayblade. More moist areas are home to marsh pennywort and royal fern rhododendron and sycamore. There are dormice, badgers and bats in the woods and bird species include kingfisher, dipper and wagtail.

The lakes contain wild brown trout and are used for fly fishing.

Otterhead Forest School is based at Otterhead Lakes
