= Christmas Island (disambiguation) =

Christmas Island is an Australian island territory in the Indian Ocean.

Christmas Island may also refer to:

== Places ==
- Shire of Christmas Island, which governs Christmas Island
- Christmas Island, Nova Scotia, a community in Canada
- Kiritimati, sometimes referred to as Christmas Island, an island of Kiribati in the Pacific Ocean and site of British nuclear tests in the 1950s
- Christmas Island (Tasmania), an island off the coast of north-western Tasmania, Australia
- Little Christmas Island, an island off eastern Tasmania, Australia

== Music ==
- Christmas Island (Jimmy Buffett album), 1996, or the title song
- Christmas Island (Leon Redbone album), 1988
- Christmas Island (Andrew Jackson Jihad album), 2014, or the title song
- "Christmas Island", a song originally recorded by The Andrews Sisters with Guy Lombardo and His Royal Canadians in 1946, and subsequently recorded by many others
- "Christmas Island", a song by Depeche Mode released as a B-side on the single "A Question of Lust"
- "Christmas Island", a song by Tony Macalpine on the 2001 album Chromaticity
- "Christmas Island", a song by Sixpence None the Richer on the 2008 album The Dawn of Grace
- "Christmas Island", a song by Lake on the 2009 album Let's Build a Roof, known for being used as the outro of Adventure Time
- "Christmas Island", a song by Train on the 2015 album Christmas in Tahoe

== See also ==
- Christmas Island imperial-pigeon
- Christmas Island red crab
- Christmas Island shrew
- Christmas (disambiguation)
