= River Otter, Devon =

River in Somerset and Devon, England

Coordinates: 50.670224°N 3.294590°W

River Otter
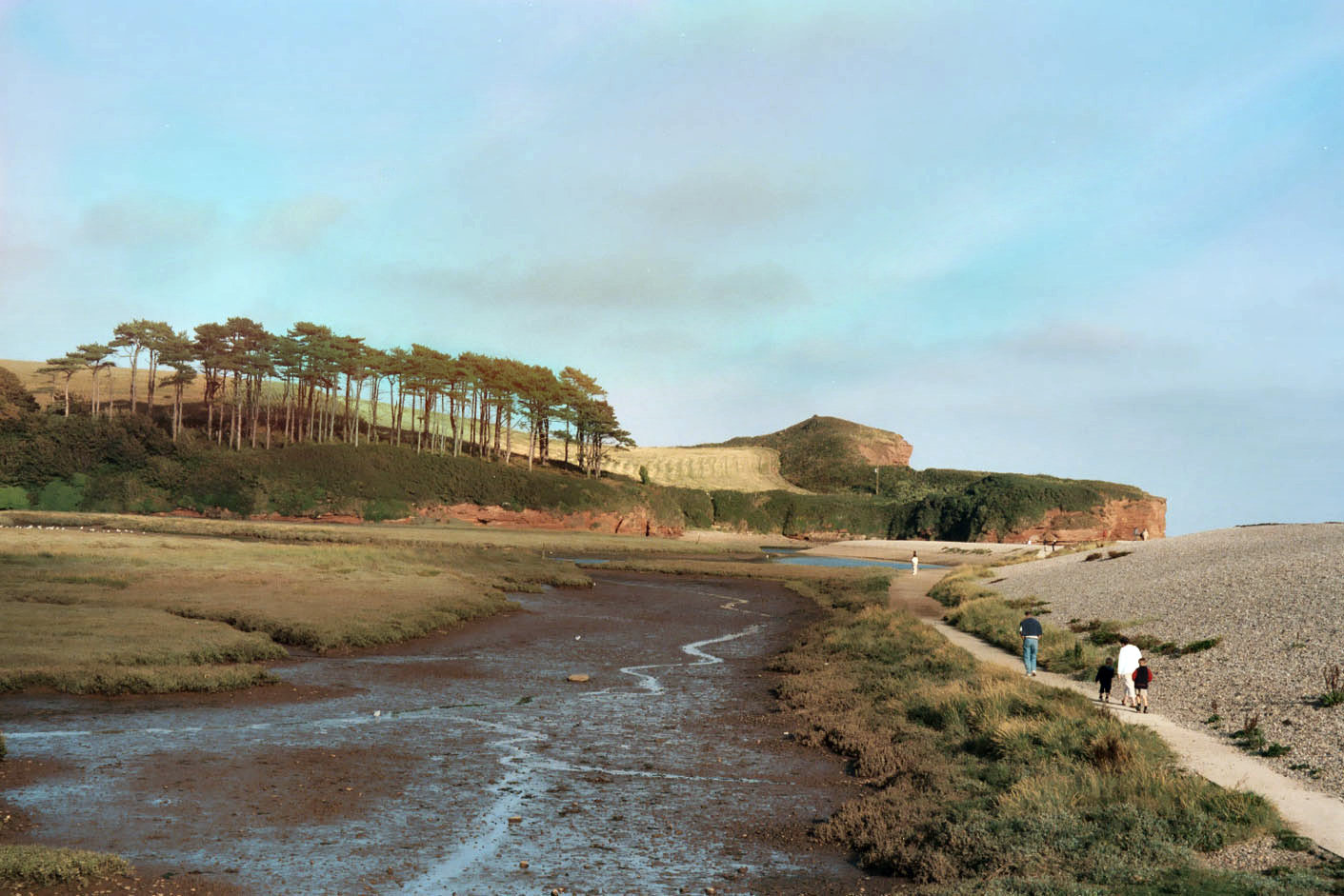
- The tidal estuary of the Otter. The river flows left to right, in front of the distinctive hill. The marsh (foreground) is separated from the sea by a steep pebble bar (right).

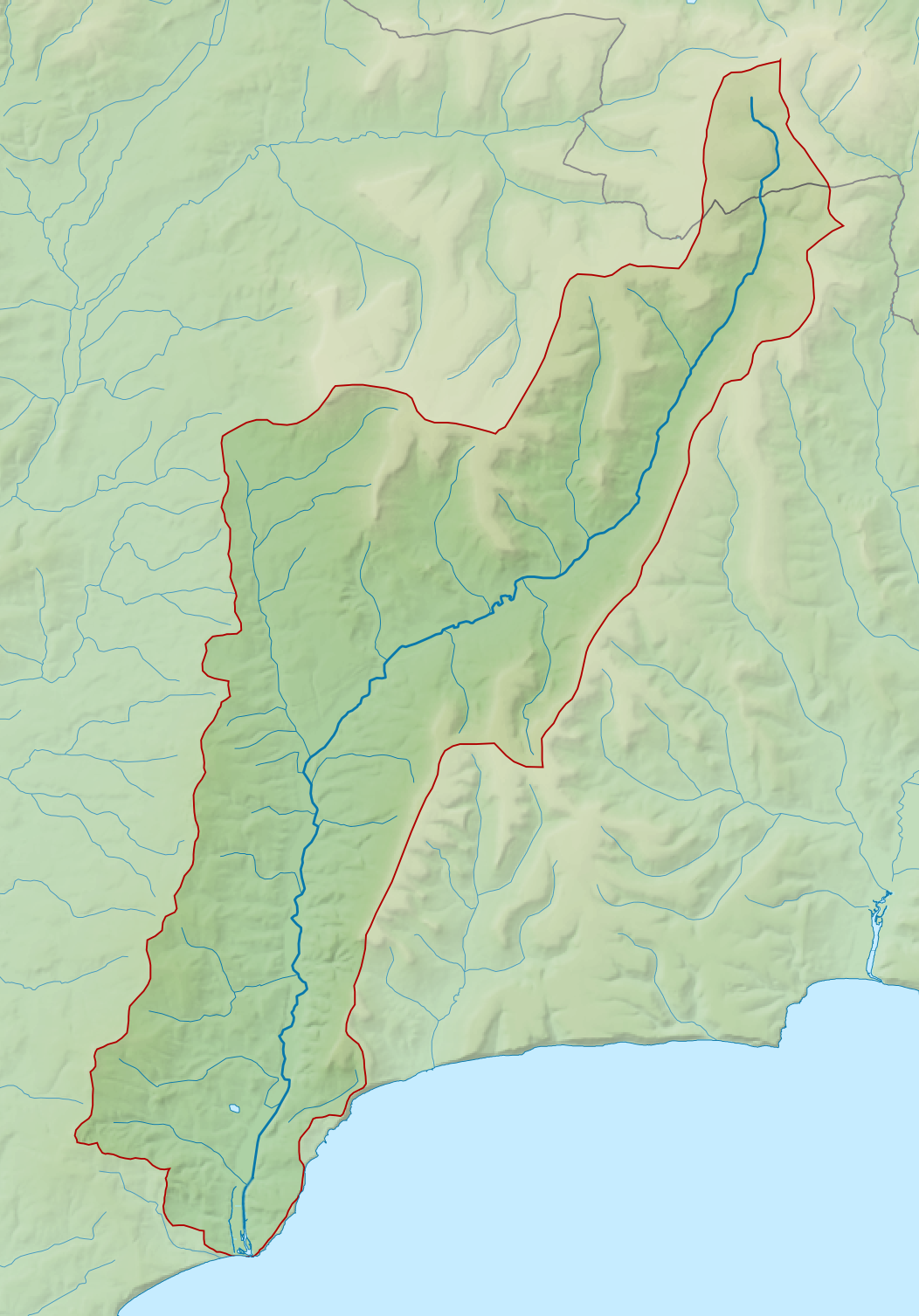
- Map of the River Otter and its catchment.

Location
- Country: England
- Counties: Somerset, Devon

Physical characteristics
- Source
  - location: Blackdown Hills, Somerset, England
  - elevation: 275 m (902 ft)
- Mouth
  - location: Budleigh Salterton, Devon, England
  - elevation: 0 m (0 ft)
- Length: 44 km (27 mi)
- Discharge
  - location: Dotton
  - average: 3.12 m^{3}/s (110 cu ft/s)
  - minimum: 0.46 m^{3}/s (16 cu ft/s)(24 August 1976)
  - maximum: 346.7 m^{3}/s (12,240 cu ft/s)(11 July 1968)
- Discharge
  - location: Fenny Bridges
  - average: 2.13 m^{3}/s (75 cu ft/s)

Basin features
- Tributaries
  - right: River Tale

The River Otter is a river that rises in the Blackdown Hills just inside the county of Somerset, England near Otterford, then flows south through East Devon. It enters the English Channel at the western end of Lyme Bay, part of the Jurassic Coast, a UNESCO World Heritage Site. The Permian and Triassic sandstone aquifer in the Otter Valley is one of Devon's largest groundwater sources, supplying drinking water to 200,000 people.

== Topography ==
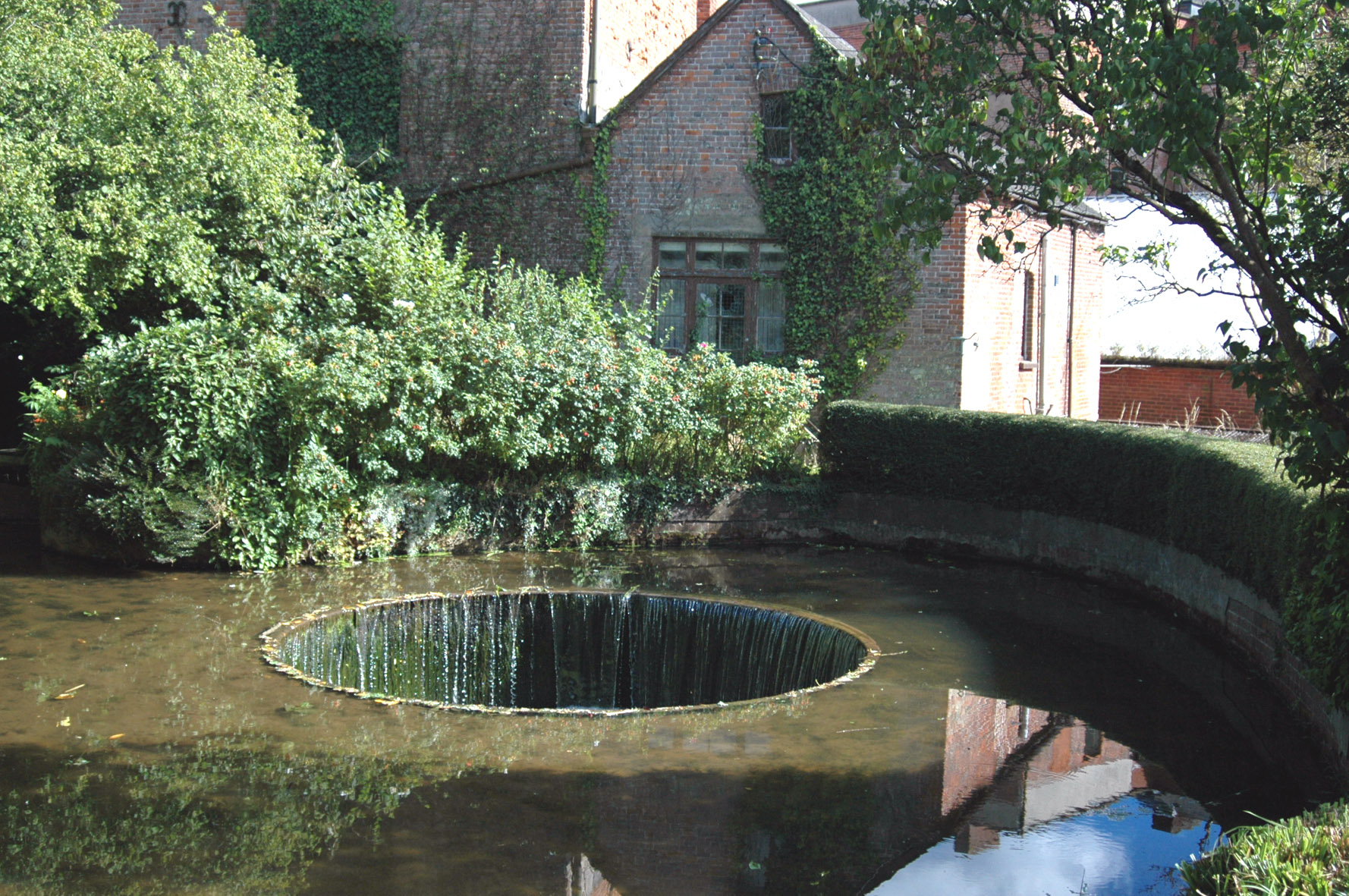
Known as the Tumbling Weir, at Ottery St Mary, water flows inwards over concentric circles, returning to the river via a tunnel.

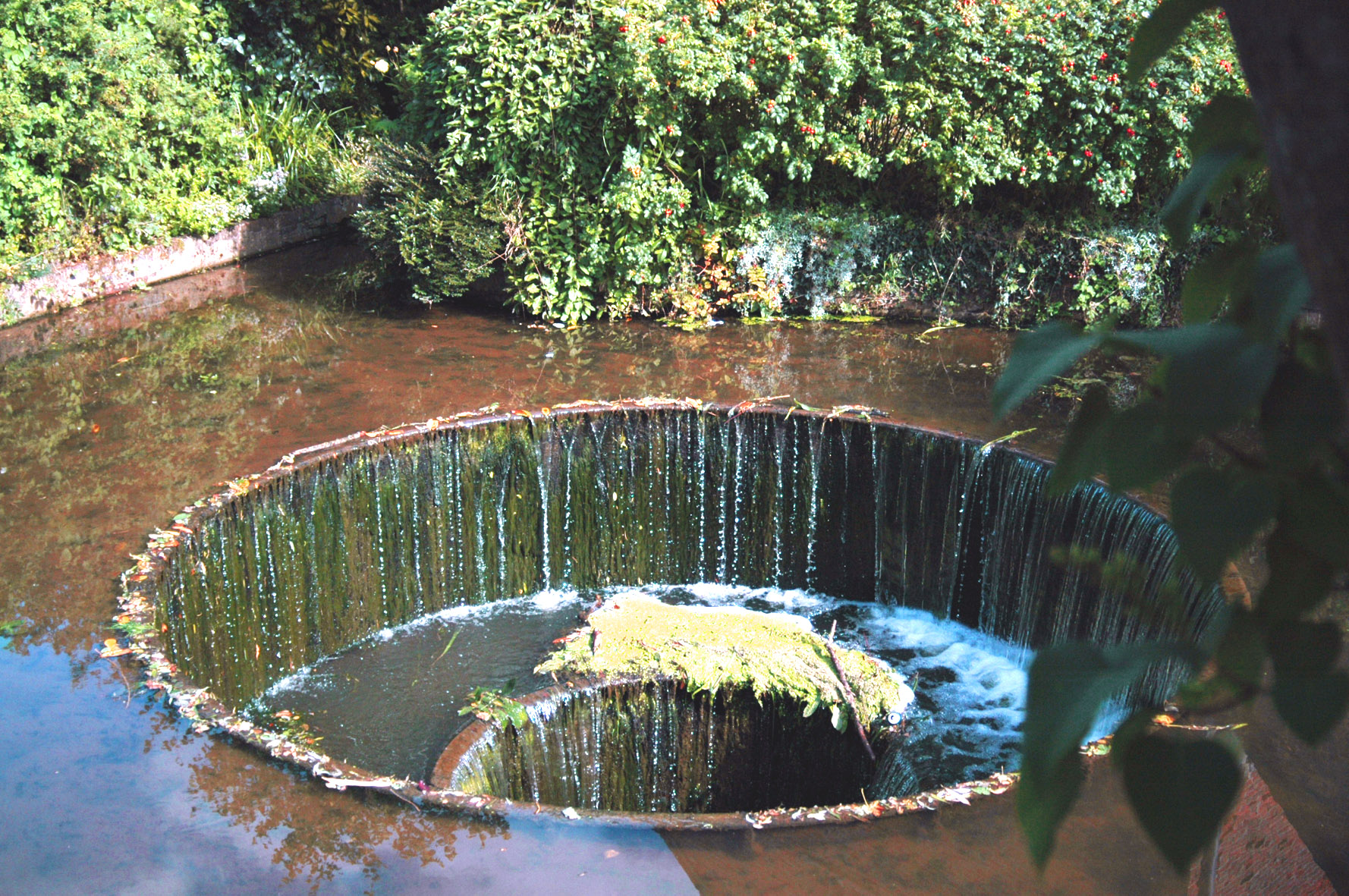
Close up of the Tumbling Weir.

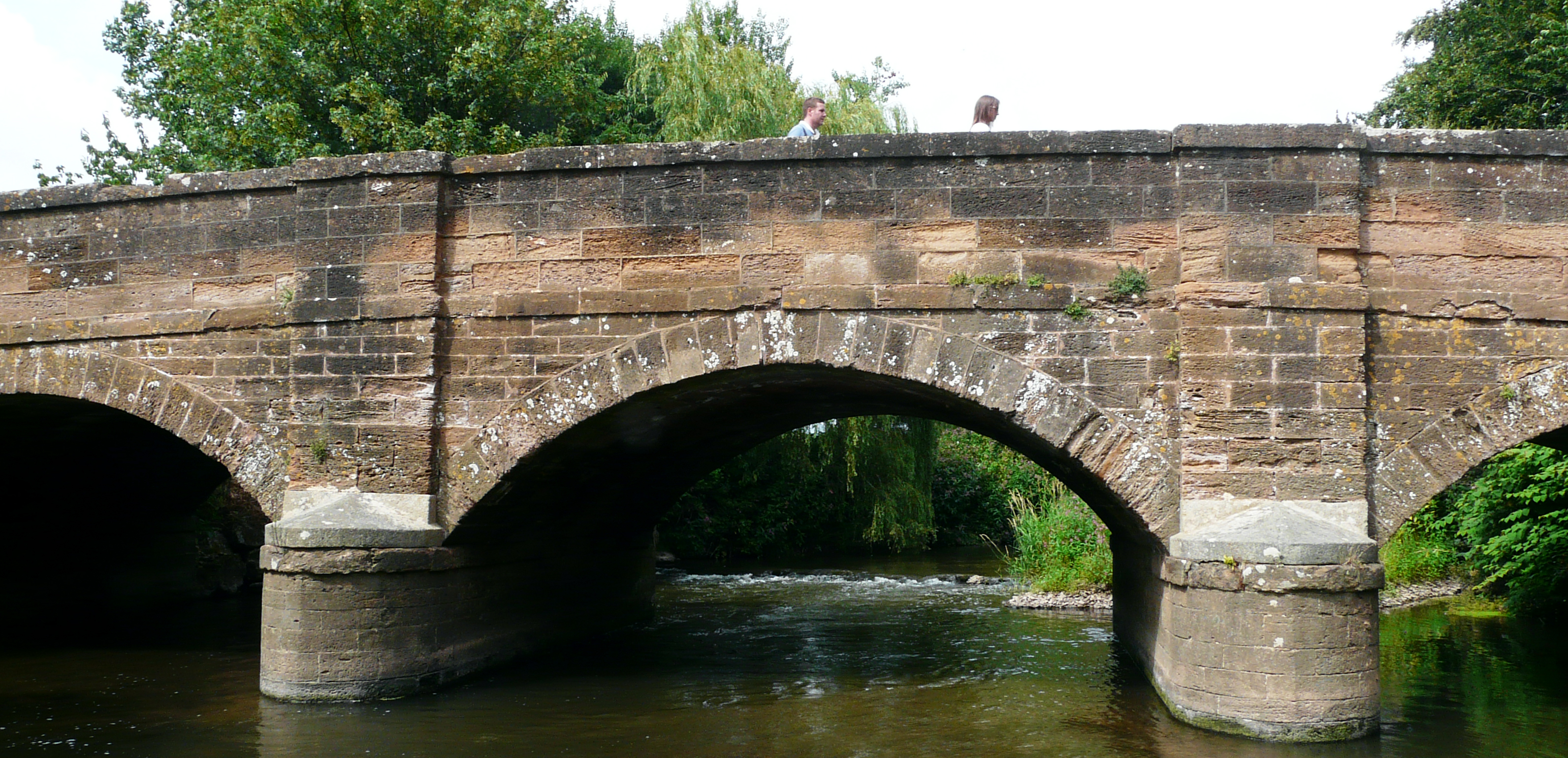
Bridge over River Otter, at Otterton.

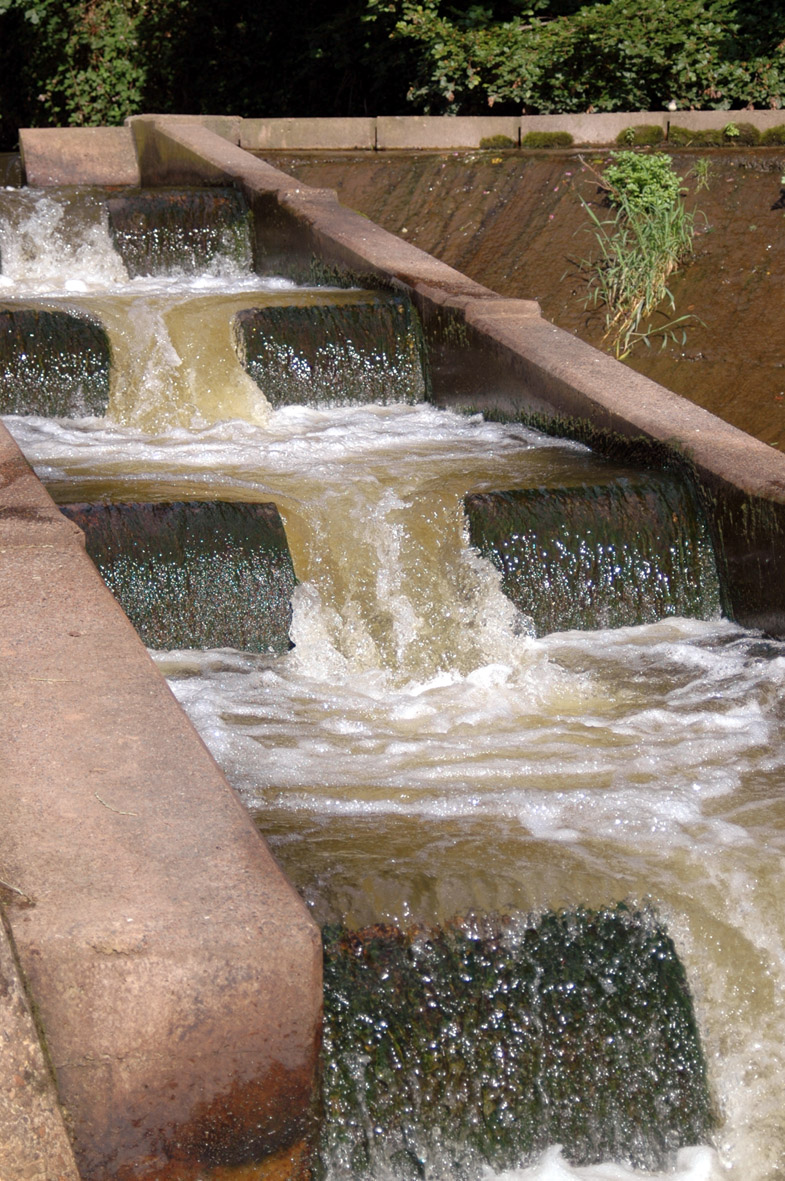
Fish pass on River Otter, alongside weir (top right in photo) near Otterton.

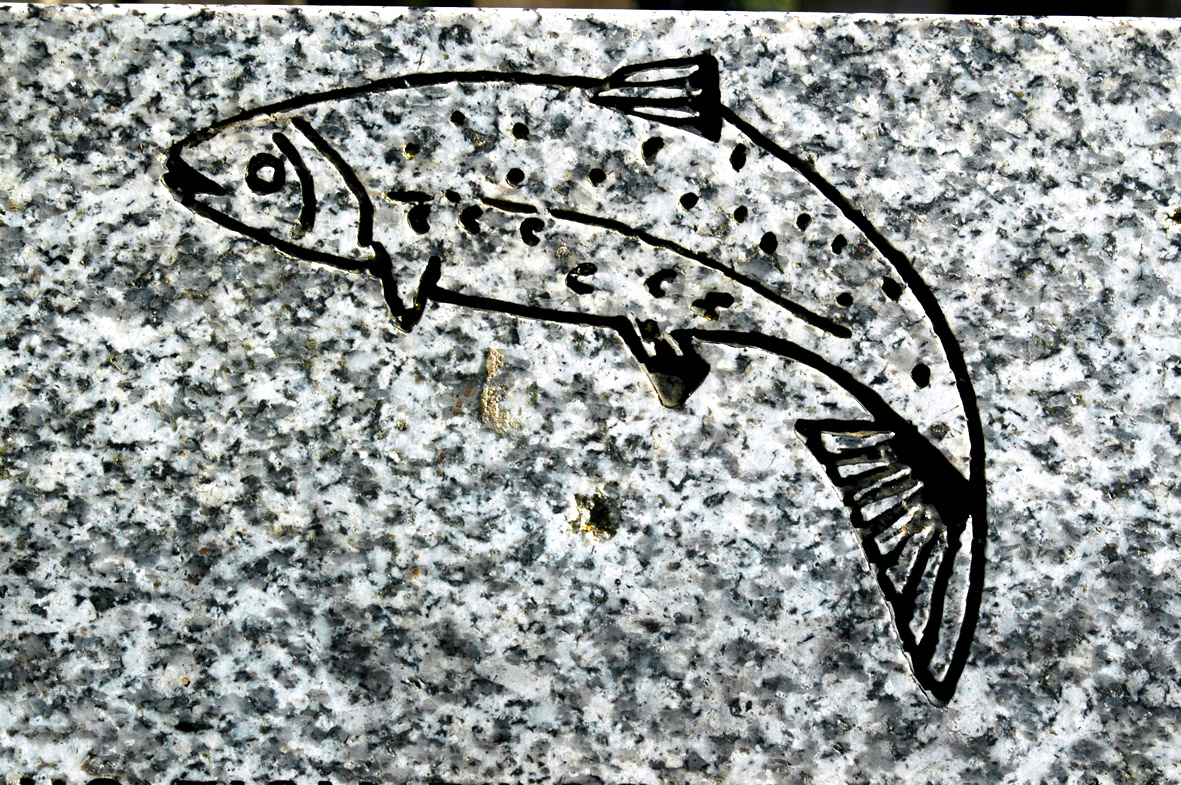
Fish logo on tablet recording construction of the fish pass.

The river's source is north of Otterford, where a stream feeds the Otterhead Lakes: ST225152 and then through Churchstanton before entering Devon.

The river flows through a predominantly rural area, with small cattle, sheep and dairy farms. The largest town in the Otter Valley is Honiton. Tourism and leisure play important roles in the economy. For much of its length, the river flows through two Areas of Outstanding Natural Beauty (AONBs) – the Blackdown Hills National Landscape (to the north of Honiton) and East Devon National Landscape (to the south of Ottery St Mary).

The river passes through or by Upottery, Rawridge, Monkton, Honiton, Alfington, Ottery St Mary, Tipton St John, Newton Poppleford and Otterton. It then reaches the Otter Estuary to the east of Budleigh Salterton.

The Otter Estuary Nature Reserve is a 57-acre (230,000 m^{2}) Site of Special Scientific Interest (SSSI) consisting of tidal mudflats and saltmarsh. There is no public access to the estuary itself but footpaths lead to two viewing platforms on the west and two hides one on the west and one on the east. The wintering population of wildfowl and waders includes common redshank, greenshank, dunlin, common sandpiper, ringed plover, grey plover, Eurasian curlew, common snipe, water rail, Eurasian wigeon, Eurasian teal, common shelduck, brent goose, red-breasted merganser and little grebe. Eurasian reed warbler, reed bunting and sedge warbler breed on the reserve.

The Environment Agency measures the water level of the Otter and its tributaries at six or more "river level stations".

The point at which the river reaches the coast (SY077820) is part of the Jurassic Coast, a World Heritage Site.

A small tributary is the River Tale, with the confluence NW of Ottery St Mary. This small town (associated with Samuel Taylor Coleridge, Sir Walter Raleigh, and an annual tar barrel rolling event) is the site of an unusual circular weir, known as the Tumbling Weir. Another small tributary is Budleigh Brook, which joins the Otter at East Budleigh.

At one time there were as many as fifty watermills powered by the River Otter. One of the remaining working mills, thought to date from the 17th century, is Tracey Mill near Honiton. In the 1970s, fish ponds were dug around the mill, fed by the leat; over a million gallons of fresh water flow through these ponds every day, helping the commercial production of trout "without the need for antibiotics or added oxygen".

One mill, at Dotton, is known to have operated from around 1100 to 1960, after which the building was demolished. The site was excavated by Channel 4's archaeological television programme Time Team, the episode "The Domesday Mill" being broadcast in 2007. This mill is mentioned in the Domesday Book. A weir diverted water to the mill's leat, supplying the vertical breast-shot wheel. Dotton (now little more than a farm) is 4.5 miles (7.2 km) from the mouth of the Otter, and about 1 mile (1.6 km) north of the village of Colaton Raleigh.

At the village of Otterton (once a seaport on a larger Otter Estuary), Otterton Mill is a working watermill over 1,000 years old; it was one of the three largest mills in Devon as recorded in the Domesday Book of 1086. It is powered by water diverted through a leat. Immediately north of the leat, a fish pass has been constructed beside a river-wide weir, restoring migratory fish runs to the river after a break of over 100 years.

== Coleridge ==
The poet Samuel Taylor Coleridge (1772–1834), who was born in Ottery St Mary, wrote a sonnet entitled "Sonnet to the River Otter".

At Ottery St Mary the river is spanned by a 95-metre (312 ft) foot and cycle bridge named Coleridge Bridge; built at a cost approaching £1 million, this was officially opened on 29 August 2011. A small area of land at one end of the bridge was sold to the local authority by William Coleridge, 5th Baron Coleridge, a descendant of the poet.

== Beaver population ==
The Otter is the only river in England known to contain a wild breeding population of Eurasian beavers, a species that died out in Britain in around 1550. The origin of the population is not known; it was first noticed in 2013, apparently successfully bearing three kits the next year.

Following concern from local landowners and anglers, as well as farmers worrying that the beavers could carry disease, the government announced that it would capture the beavers and place them in a zoo or wildlife park. A sport fishing industry lobbyist group, the Angling Trust, said "it would be irresponsible even to consider re-introducing this species into the wild without first restoring our rivers to good health."

This decision to immediately remove the beavers was protested by local residents and campaign groups, with environmental journalist George Monbiot describing the government and Angling Trust as "control freaks": "I'm an angler, and the Angling Trust does not represent me on this issue...most anglers, in my experience, have a powerful connection with nature. The chance of seeing remarkable wild animals while waiting quietly on the riverbank is a major part of why we do it." The introduction of beavers to rivers has been encouraged by environmentalists, who have argued that beaver dams provide a habitat for birds and fish, reduce the strength of flooding by trapping water high up in a catchment area, away from homes further downstream, and could be a future tourist attraction.

In January 2015, Natural England said that the beavers would be allowed to remain on condition that they were disease-free and of the Eurasian species (not North American beavers, which would be invasive). These conditions were met, and the beavers were returned to the river as part of a five-year trial. In August 2020, the government announced that the beavers, which by then numbered 15 family groups, could remain on the river indefinitely. It was the first legally sanctioned reintroduction of an extinct native animal anywhere in England.
