= Tumbling Weir =

Circular weir in Devon, England

Coordinates: 50.75055°N 3.28474°W

The Tumbling Weir is a circular weir in the town of Ottery St. Mary, Devon, England, that allows water from a leat or man-made stream to reach the River Otter.

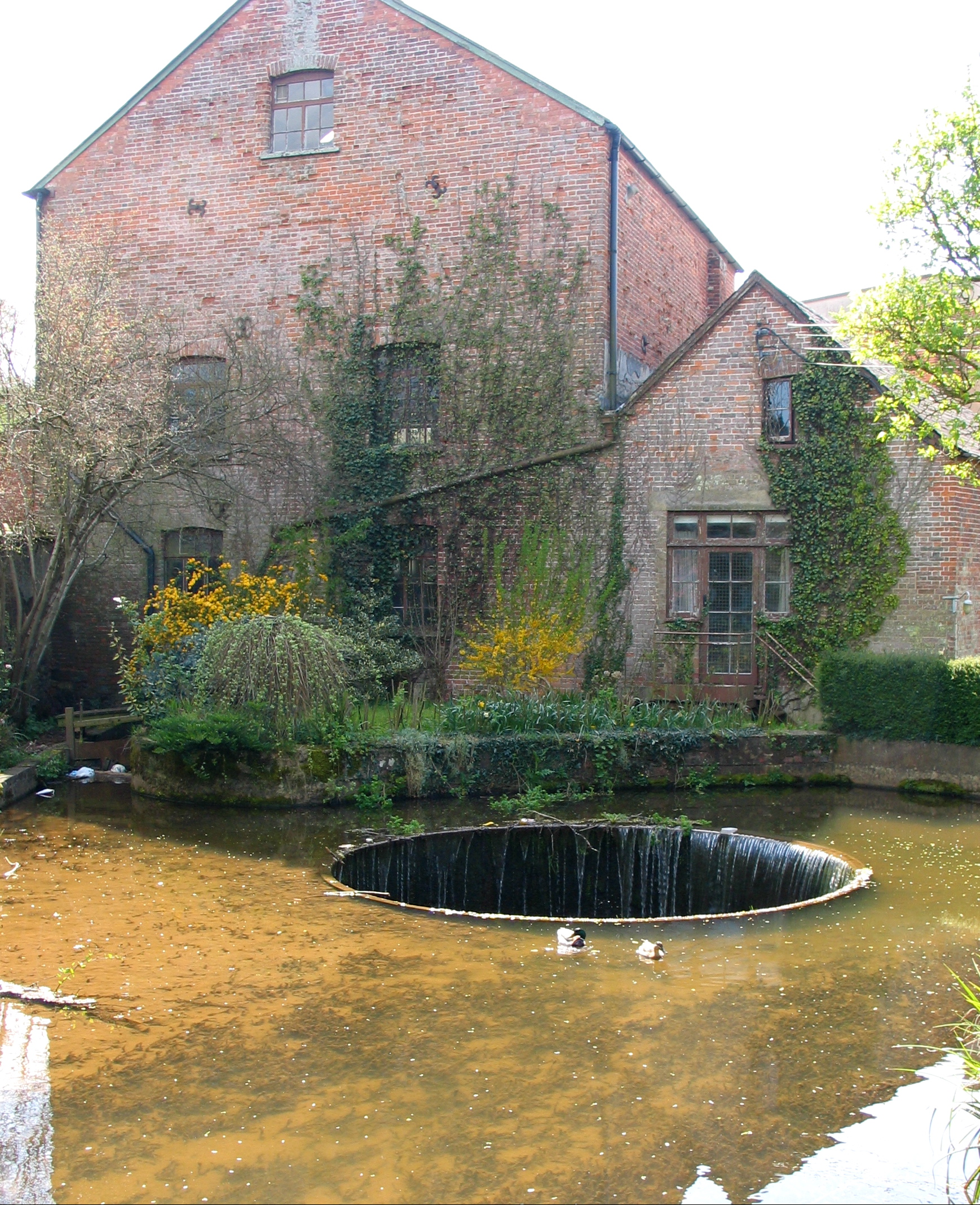
The Tumbling Weir, Ottery St Mary

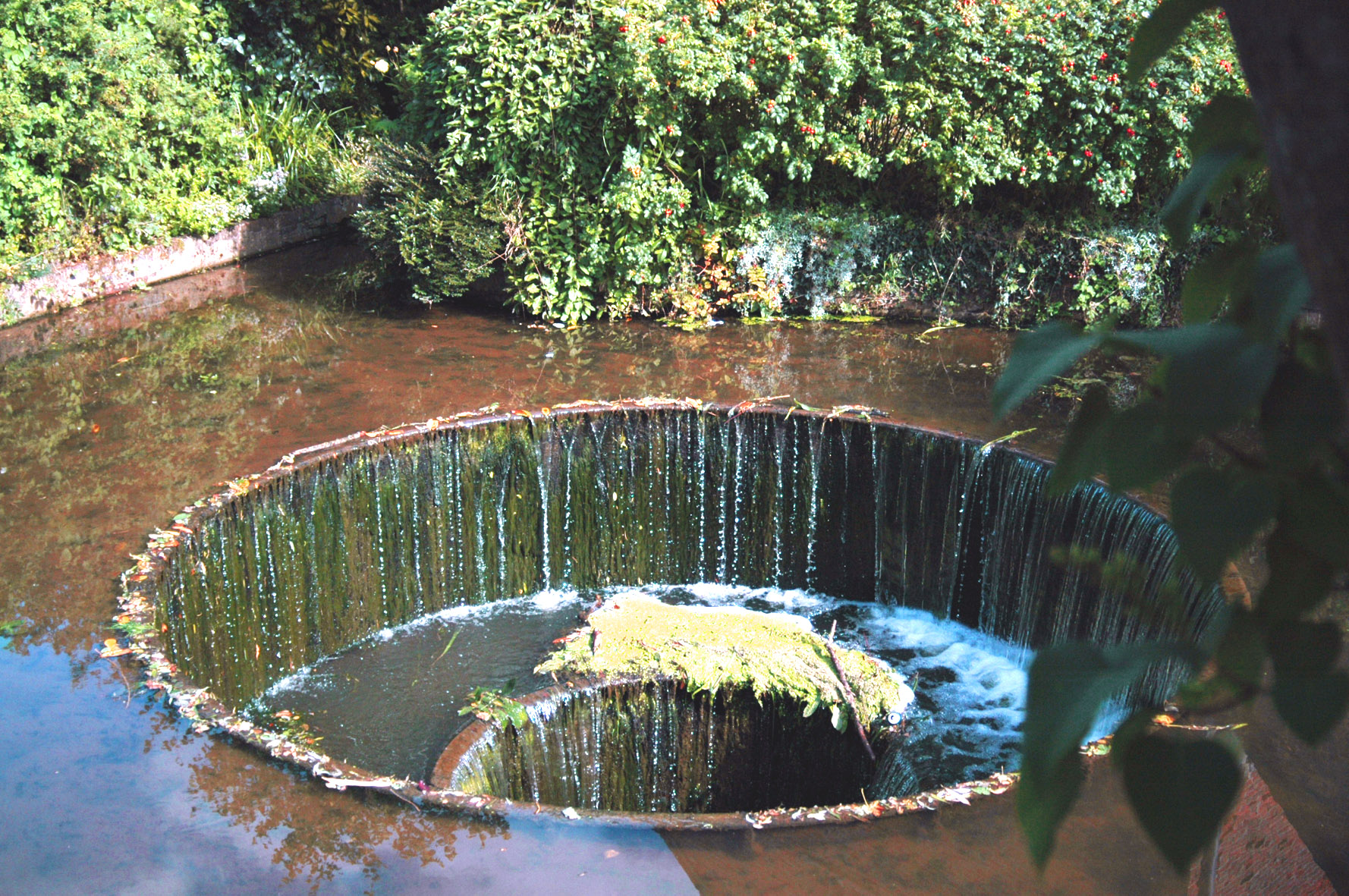
Close-up of Tumbling Weir

It is apparently a rare design in that the water enters through a circular opening at the top that is surrounded by the stream. The water then cascades down several smaller rings until it enters a culvert, which leads into a tunnel under the nearby path before sluicing down to the river a few metres away.

== Today ==
Today the mill site and the adjoining factory is unoccupied, awaiting re-development. Near the site is the Tumbling Weir Hotel, a converted 17th century thatched house, now a popular hotel and restaurant.

The mill and adjoining factory has now been re-developed into residential properties.
