= Merry Christmas (disambiguation) =

"Merry Christmas" is a spoken or written greeting traditionally used on or before the Christmas holiday.

Merry Christmas may also refer to:

== Film and television ==
- Merry Christmas (1984 film), a 1984 Hong Kong film directed by Clifton Ko
- Merry Christmas (2000 film), a 2000 Argentine film directed by Lucho Bender
- Merry Christmas (2001 film), a 2001 Italian film directed by Neri Parenti
- Merry Christmas (2024 film), a 2024 Indian thriller film
- Joyeux Noël (Merry Christmas), a 2005 French film
- "Merry Christmas," an episode of the animated series Ben 10

== Music ==
=== Albums ===
- Merry Christmas (Bing Crosby album), 1945
- Merry Christmas (Johnny Mathis album), 1958
- Merry Christmas (The Supremes album), 1965
- Merry Christmas (Andy Williams album), 1965
- Merry Christmas (Daniel Johnston album), 1988
- Merry Christmas (Glen Campbell album), 1991
- Merry Christmas (Mariah Carey album), 1994
- Merry Christmas (FM Einheit and Caspar Brötzmann album), 1994
- Merry Christmas (Jeanette album), 2004
- Merry Christmas (Kate Ceberano album), 2009
- Merry Christmas (Shelby Lynne album), 2010
- Merry Christmas (Leningrad Cowboys album), 2013
- Merry Christmas (Paulini album), 2015
- A Merry Christmas!, Stan Kenton, 1961

=== Songs ===
- "Merry Christmas" (song), a song by Ed Sheeran and Elton John
- "Merry Christmas", a song by Melanie from Born to Be
- "Merry Christmas", a song by Stephanie Mills from Christmas
- "Merry Christmas", a song from the 1949 film In the Good Old Summertime
- "Happy Merry Christmas", by Park Bo-gum, 2019

== See also ==
- Merry Christmas Creek, a creek in Alaska
- Mary Christmas, the speculated maiden name for Mrs. Claus
- Christmas (disambiguation)
- Happy Christmas (disambiguation)
- Feliz Navidad (disambiguation)
