= Neil McNulty =

Scottish actor

- Born: 18 January 1985 (age 41); Glasgow, Scotland
- Education: Royal Conservatoire of Scotland
- Occupation: Actor

Neil McNulty (born 18 January 1985) is a Scottish actor. He has played the part of Fraser Crozier in the BBC soap opera River City. He also worked for the actors agency Conway van Gelder Grant in London.

== Filmography ==
=== Film ===
Year	Title	Role	Notes
2005	Joyeux Noël	Un soldat écossais	
2008	New Town Killers	Turbonegro Fan	
2012	Love Cake	George	
2014	What Happens After Six	Police Officer #2	Short Film

=== Television ===
Year	Title	Role	Notes
2007	The Bill	Billy Campbell	1 Episode
2010	Taggart	Paul Hardie	1 Episode
2008–2011	River City	Fraser Crozier	
2012	Hustle	Spencer Gibbs	1 Episode
2012	The Hour	Michael	1 Episode
2013	Doctors	Russell Holden	1 Episode

=== Stage ===
- Wolves in the Walls – (National Theatre of Scotland)
- Love and Money – (National Theatre of Scotland / Royal Conservatoire of Scotland)
- The Callanish Stoned – (Theatre Hebrides)
- San Diego – (Royal Conservatoire of Scotland)
- Beauty and the Beast – (Royal Conservatoire of Scotland)
- Last Supper – (Royal Conservatoire of Scotland)
- King Lear – (Royal Conservatoire of Scotland)
- Medea – (Royal Conservatoire of Scotland)
