= Unforeseen Incidents =

2018 video game

- Developer: Backwoods Entertainment
- Publisher: Application Systems Heidelberg
- Platforms: Microsoft Windows, macOS, Linux, Nintendo Switch
- Release: Windows, macOS, Linux: NA: 24 May 2018; Nintendo Switch: WW: 27 January 2022
- Genre: Point-and-click adventure game
- Mode: Single-player

Unforeseen Incidents is a 2018 point-and-click adventure game developed by German company Backwoods Entertainment. Players control a local handyman who investigates a mysterious viral outbreak in his town.

== Gameplay ==
Harper Pendrell, a handyman, learns that a mysterious virus is killing citizens in Yelltown. Aided by a local academic and a reporter, Pendrell attempts to uncover who has unleashed the virus and why. Players control Pendrell as he performs his investigation. Rock, Paper, Shotgun described the puzzles as "extremely traditional" for an adventure game but said they differ from the usual implementation by having solutions in which the protagonist is not manipulative toward people who are supposedly his friends. For example, solutions may involve helping a friend to address a personal problem rather than exploiting it. As a handyman, Pendrell also solves some puzzles through the use of his tools. Items may be picked up and used to solve inventory-based puzzles, but some items are red herrings that do not have any in-game use.

== Development and release ==
The English-language dialogue is not a straight translation of the German dialogue. Instead, British comedian Alasdair Beckett-King contributed original dialogue. Unforeseen Incidents was released on 24 May 2018. A Nintendo Switch version is set to be release on 27 January 2022.

== Reception ==
Metacritic, a review aggregator, rated it 80/100 based on reviews from 13 critics, which the site catalogs as "generally favorable reviews ". Karla Munger of Just Adventure rated the game A− and wrote that the game "achieves a skillful balance between serious and genuinely funny", though she found some of the puzzles too frustrating. Writing for Rock Paper Shotgun, John Walker called it "a sharp, smart, witty and superbly constructed adventure", praising the voice acting, music, and art. Walker described the game's socially progressive values as unobtrusive and never devolving into virtue signalling. In his review for PC World, Fergus Halliday wrote the game is "predictable and familiar but has just enough to charm to win you over nevertheless". The conclusion reached by Adventure Gamers's critic, Richard Hoover, reads: "With a great voice cast, distinctive visual style, and intricate puzzle design, Unforeseen Incidents delivers a solid if well-worn story of a nobody from nowhere saving the world."
