= Happy Christmas (disambiguation) =

"Happy Christmas" is a spoken or written greeting commonly used on or before the Christmas holiday.

Happy Christmas may also refer to:

== Music ==
- Happy Christmas (compilation album), a 1998 compilation album released by BEC Records
  - Happy Christmas Vol. 2, released in 1999
  - Happy Christmas Vol. 3, released in 2000
  - Happy Christmas Vol. 4, released in 2005
  - Happy Christmas Vol. 5, released in 2010
- Happy Christmas (Jessica Simpson album), 2010
- Happy Christmas (EP), a 2010 EP by I Can Make a Mess Like Nobody's Business
- "Happy Xmas (War Is Over)", a 1971 single by John Lennon, Yoko Ono, and the Plastic Ono Band
- The 20 Greatest Christmas Songs, 1986 album by Boney M. that was re-issued in 1991 as Happy Christmas
- "Happy Christmas", a 2006 song by Bae Seul-ki

== Other uses ==
- Happy Christmas (film), a 2014 film

== See also ==
- Happy Ero Christmas, a 2003 South Korean romantic comedy film
- Merry Christmas (disambiguation)
