= River Tale =

River in Devon, England

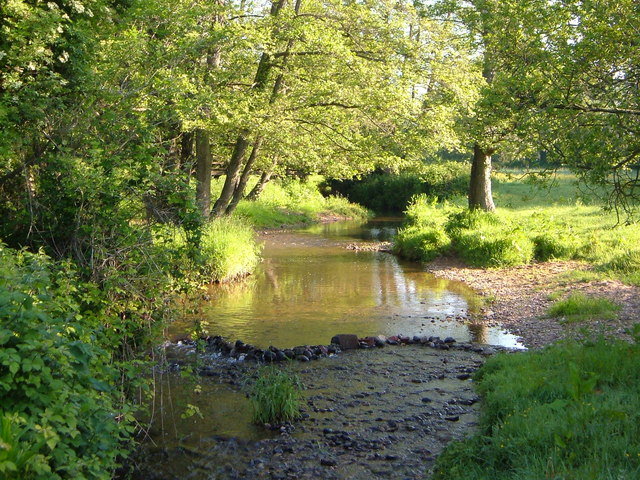
- River Tale near Cadhay

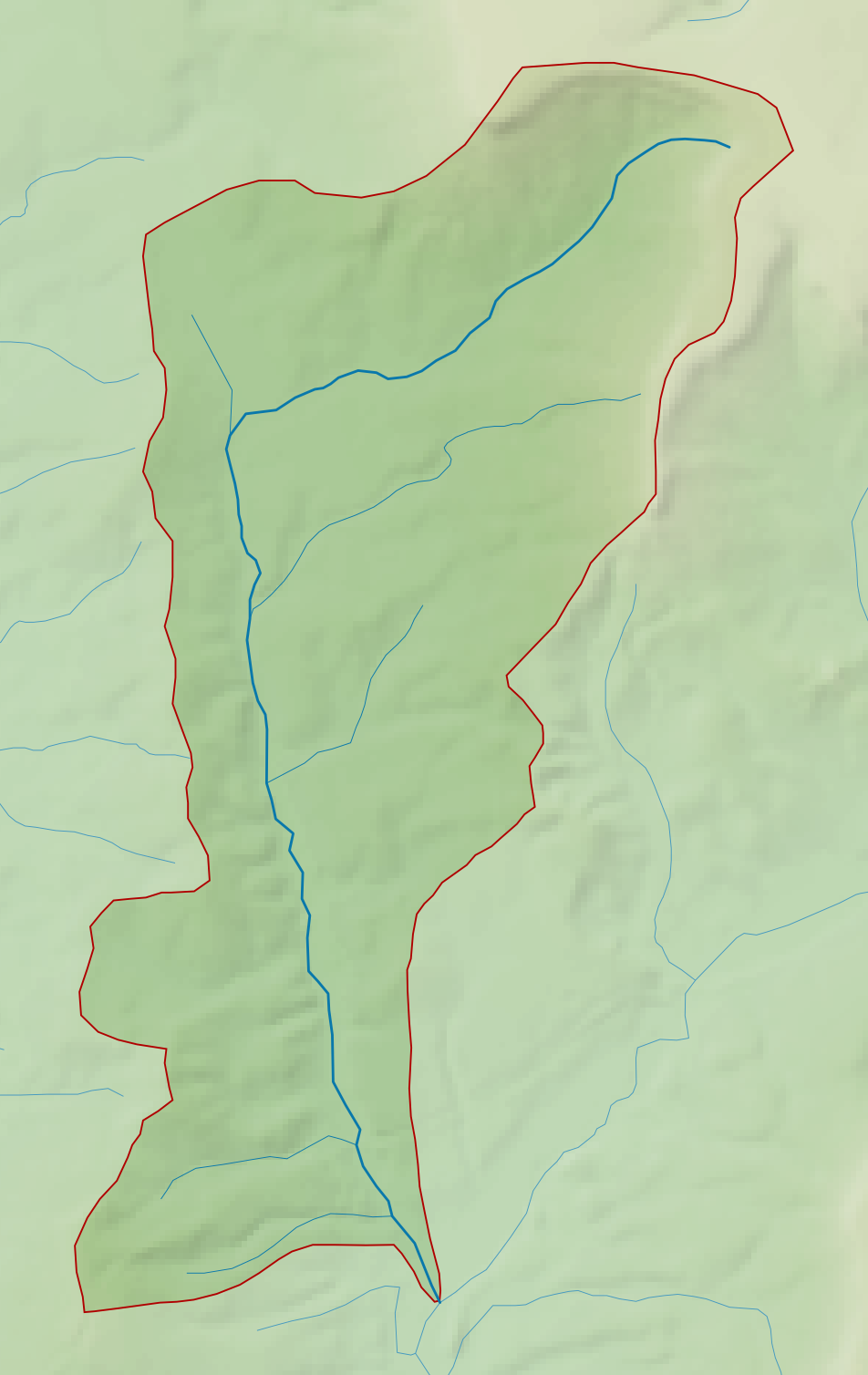
- Catchment map of the River Tale

- Location within Devon

Location
- Country: England
- County: Devon

Physical characteristics
- Source: Broadhembury
- Mouth: River Otter, Devon
  - location: Devon
  - coordinates: 50.7562°N 3.2880°W
- Length: 14.2 km (8.8 mi)
- Discharge
  - location: Fairmile
  - average: 0.44 m^{3}/s (16 cu ft/s)

The River Tale is a small river that drains the southern slopes of the Blackdown Hills, in Devon, England. It is a tributary of the River Otter and 8.8 miles (14.2 km) in length. Its name is derived from getæl (Old English) meaning "quick, active or swift"; however, the river is noted as being "sluggish". One theory is that its name was transferred from Tala Water, a tributary of the nearby River Tamar. The river is the site of ongoing efforts to reintroduce the water vole, which is thought to be extinct in Devon.

== Course ==
The river rises on the southern flanks of the Blackdown Hills, beneath North Hill, and flows southwest through the village of Broadhembury and beneath the A373. It then turns south and passes alongside the grounds of Escot House before flowing through Fairmile where it is crossed by the A30 until it joins the River Otter at Cadhay near Ottery St Mary.

== Hydrology ==
Since 1978 the river levels and flows of the Tale have been measured in its lower reaches near Fairmile. The thirty-six year record shows that the catchment of 34 square kilometres (13 sq mi) to the gauging station yielded an average flow of 0.44 cubic metres per second (16 cu ft/s). The highest river level recorded occurred in December 1981 with a height of 1.72 metres (5 ft 8 in) through the gauge, giving a corresponding flow of 19.56 cubic metres per second (691 cu ft/s).

The catchment upstream of the station has an average annual rainfall of 921 millimetres (36.3 in) and a maximum altitude of 283 metres (928 ft) at North Hill. Land use is primarily agricultural arable and grassland.

The river has a natural flow regime, unaffected by direct artificial influences.

== Ecology ==
The River Tale has been classed as having moderate quality under the Water Framework Directive. This is the middle band in the five-part framework scale, which ranges from high, good, and moderate, through to poor and finally bad. The chemical quality, however, was considered good in 2014.

Due to a number of factors, such as the loss of their natural habitat and predation by the non-native American mink (Neovison vison), water voles (Arvicola amphibius) were considered extinct in Devon’s rivers by 2000.

In 2004, the Tale was chosen as a site for the reintroduction of this endangered species, because the river corridor had been restored as part of a project to improve the habitat and water quality of the river. This included fencing the river to prevent cattle damaging the bankside vegetation, and trapping mink. Following the improvements, there have been increases in the number of fish, and evidence that otters (Lutra lutra), have recolonised the river.

== See also ==
- List of rivers of England
