= Celestina Sommer =

Victorian murderer

- Portrait of Sommer c.1856 (detail from a 19th-century broadside ballad)
- Born: Celestina Christmas; July 1, 1827; Islington, Middlesex, England
- Died: April 11, 1859 (aged 31); Fisherton Asylum, Fisherton Anger, Wiltshire, England
- Resting place: Salisbury
- Other name: Islington Murderess
- Spouse: Karl Sommer
- Children: 1
- Criminal charges: Murder
- Penalty: Penal servitude for life

Details
- Victims: 1

Celestina Sommer (née Christmas; 1 July 1827 – 11 April 1859) was a Victorian murderer, notorious for her escape from the death penalty and the murder of her only daughter. Known as the Islington Murderess, she became an international cause célèbre, examined in the world's press, both houses of the British Parliament, and even Queen Victoria's inner circle. Her case, recently rediscovered, reignited debates on crime and insanity, capital punishment, and crime and gender.

== Early life ==
She was born on 1 July 1827, the fourth of eight children from a respectable family of silversmiths in Islington, Middlesex. An accomplished pianist and music teacher, she performed regularly at the famed St Martin's Hall, Covent Garden as a member of the John Hullah school of music.

In 1845, when she was 18, she gave birth to an illegitimate daughter and named her Celestina. Because of the hardships and social stigmas for unmarried mothers in the Victorian period, she immediately handed her child over to a foster family, Thomas and Julia Harrington.

In 1854, Celestina married Charles (Karl) Sommer, a Prussian migrant working in the metalwork and jewelry business, possibly for, or even with, Celestina's father. The pair were married by licence at St Mary's, Islington Parish Church, Middlesex. From the beginning, they lived in Charles' house, in a nearby area redeveloped as the Packington Estate.

== Crime ==
On 16 February 1856, Celestina collected her estranged daughter from her foster parent, who lived at an address in Hackney. Celestina led her daughter back to the Sommer resident where, in the front cellar, she cut her throat. The event was heard by her maid-of-all-work Rachel Munt, who was sleeping in the kitchen adjacent to where the crime was committed. The next day, Munt managed to raise the alarm without alerting her mistress, and at 4:30 pm on 17 February, both Celestina and Charles were arrested on suspicion of murder. Inspector Edward Hutton and Sergeant Edwin Townsend removed the pair to Hoxton police station.

=== Remand hearing ===
Two hearings in front of the magistrate, William Corrie JP, held at Clerkenwell Police Court, Bagnigge Wells Road (now King's Cross Road) identified the dead girl as Celestina's daughterand deduced (incorrectly) a motive for the killing. Charles was freed after rejecting any idea of his involvement. He was out of the house on the evening of the murder and had never met his wife's illegitimate child.

=== Coroner's inquest ===
The inquest was held at the North Pole Inn, New-north road, Islington. The jury cited Celestina Sommer as complicit in her daughter's demise. As Rachel Munt, the key witness, headed home towards Hoxton, she and her sister were chased by an angry mob toward Arlington Street. Townsend and fellow police sergeant George Beckley, managed to whisk them away through a rear door of the Rydon Arms pub (now a private house), only for the crowd to renew their chase beyond Shepherdess Walk. Near the canal bridge, close by the Block Inn (now a private residence), the two policemen were forced to make a stand. Two passers-by escorted the sisters home via separate routes.

=== Trial ===
Celestina appeared at the Central Criminal Court (Old Bailey), on two occasions, with the first hearing on 7 March adjourned to allow the defence counsel to investigate her mental health.

On 10 April, at her second trial, after 15 minutes deliberation by the jury, she was found guilty of the willful murder of her daughter. In the dock, Celestina was described as being pallid and weak, allowed to sit through the hearing, and having requested smelling salts from the warder. As the guilty verdict was read, she was said to have slumped almost to the floor. Justice Crompton donned the black cap, then pronounced the sentence of death.

=== Criminal insanity ===
At the time of her crime, the country could not agree on what constituted insanity nor whether or not it offered exculpation for a criminal act. No formal plea was entered by her defence counsel.

=== Her supporters ===
Despite the notoriety of both herself and her crime, Sommer did attract support, based largely on her claimed but legally rejected insanity defence. Many insisted she was of unsound mind, at least at the time of her act. Alfred Dymond, Secretary of the Society for the Abolition of Capital Punishment, was one of the more energetic, writing later about her case in his 1865 treatise on controversial cases The law on its trial. As part of the response, her solicitor, Charles Octavius Humphreys, forwarded a memorial to the Home Secretary Sir George Grey. Whatever the tipping point, the politician came to Sommer's rescue. A Prison Matron (1862), recounting Celestina Sommer the individual, wrote after her death how she had died "a confirmed lunatic".

=== Reprieve ===
Sir George Grey attracted severe criticism when he belatedly commuted the death sentence, first to transportation and then penal servitude for life. News of Somner's respite arrived at Newgate Gaol the day of her execution, though the paperwork only arrived the day after. It was, though, his flat refusal to reveal his reasoning which created the greater outcry, as politicians, lawyers, press, and the public alike, clamored for an explanation. In one response to more questions in the House of Commons, Earl Granville, Lord President of the Council, confirmed the minister had recorded his reasons for her commutation in a letter prepared for his successor as was apparently normal practice. The letter, though, has never come to light.

=== Outcry ===
"... a she-devil who deliberates, inveigles her child into her den, and cuts her throat, adding to the horror and barbarity of the act by vociferations of her resolution to perpetrate it in answer to the prayers of her struggling victim, is thought a proper object for the clemency of the Crown by the Home Office" cited in the Glasgow Herald.

The outcry at her apparent escape from justice reverberated around the world. Sommer became the cause célèbre in debates about crime and the death penalty, insanity, and women felons. Parliamentary discourse, select committees, articles and books were joined by popular accusations of nepotism, racial favouritism, royal collusion and gender bias, the latter predicated on her being "a pretty woman". The world's press were fervent: elevating her from 'just' another murderess to one who became renowned and despised across the globe.

== Aftermath ==
Sommer spent several years moving through the British penal system, during which time her insanity grew more obvious, firstly in Newgate Gaol on death row, during which she shared a cell with two other murderers, Elizabeth Ann Harris and Mary Alice Seago, then at Millbank, the great Panopticon, and finally Brixton Women's Prison, where her physical health deteriorated rapidly, as did her mind. She was eventually transferred to Fisherton Asylum near Salisbury, Wiltshire which, at the time, was the largest criminal lunatic asylum outside the now overcrowded Bethlem (Broadmoor had been conceived but not yet built).

== Death and burial ==
Celestina Sommer died, aged 31, on 11 April 1859. Her post-mortem revealed "hemiplegia (stroke) from congestion of and serous effusion on the brain", plausibly consistent with brain damage and a possible physical cause of insanity. Nevertheless, many maintained that she had wrongly escaped justice, and others suggested there were other, non-physical reasons for her very real madness. On 16 April, she was buried, as many inmates from Fisherton House then were, in the new municipal cemetery at Fisherton Anger. A stone plaque was erected, but today nothing remains to indicate where she was laid to rest.

== Debate ==
Celestina Sommer committed her crime in the midst of ferocious debates between the legal and medical professions, the latter centred around the controversial alienists ("psychiatrists who assesses the competence of a defendant in a law court" - OED). At the same time, there remained no absolute definition of insanity nor of its mitigation for a criminal act, save for the equally controversial M'Naghten Rules, formulated in 1843. Many, including her jury, felt the crime had been too planned, too premeditated, for it to be considered a true act of insanity.

Although Celestina Sommer's escape from the gallows was contentious, there was a growing dissatisfaction with the death penalty. The last woman to be hanged had been Rebecca Smith in 1849. Organisations such as the Society for the Abolition of Capital Punishment and politicians like William Ewart and various peers called for the complete revocation of the ultimate sanction. (This was not achieved in Britain until 1965, following the deaths of Peter Anthony Allen and Gwynne Owen Evans for the murder of a former colleague. The last woman to be hanged in Britain, in 1955, was Ruth Ellis.) Even as late as 1864/1865, the Royal Commission on Capital Punishment cited Sommer's as a case-in-point.

Beyond the seditious claims of Sommer's escape being due to her gender and acclaimed good looks, this was a time of increased exoneration for criminal women, especially mothers. Infanticide was seen as different from cold-blooded murder, with puerperal insanity frequently cited as a mitigating force. Ongoing efforts at female emancipation lent a voice to the perceived wider injustices of a patriarchal society and the preordained role of women at home.

== Infamy ==
Contemporary accounts and comments were rife, including The Lancet, The Economist, Charles Dickens' Household Words, and many newspapers around the world, including The Times in England and The Sydney Herald in Australia.

The sources largely have been academic, citing her case as a model study. Smith's Trial by Medicine and Showalter's The Female Malady are examples.

== Bibliography ==
- A Prison Matron 1862, Female Life in Prison (Vol. 1), London: Hurst and Blackett
- Boland, F. 1996, Diminished responsibility as a defence in Ireland having regard to the law in England, Scotland and Wales, Ph.D. thesis, University of Leeds, Centre for Criminal Justice Studies
- Brooks, C. 2013, Execution of Rebecca Smith
- Crittal, E.(ed) 1962, A History of the County of Wiltshire: Volume 6, Institute of Historical Research
- Dymond, A.H. 1865, The Law on its trial: or personal recollections of the death penalty and its opponents, London: Alfred W. Bennett
- Mayhew, H. and J. Binny 1862, The criminal prisons of London and scenes of prison life, London: Griffin, Bohn & Co.
- Showalter, E. 1987 (1985), The female malady. Women, madness and English Culture 1830-1980, London: Virago Press
- Smith, R. 1981, Trial by medicine. Insanity and responsibility in Victorian trials, Edinburgh: University Press
- Stevens, M. 2013, Broadmoor Revealed: Victorian Crime and the Lunatic Asylum, Barnsley: Pen and Sword
- The Law Magazine and Law Review, vol. 10 no. 19, p198
- Vaughan, D.J. 2014a, The secret life of Celestina Sommer - a very Victorian murder
- Vaughan, D.J. 2014b, Crime and insanity in Britain: Judge, jury...and avoiding the executioner
