= Merry Christmas Creek =

Stream in Southeast Fairbanks Census Area, Alaska, U.S.

Coordinates: 64°37′02″N 142°29′19″W

Merry Christmas Creek is a stream in Southeast Fairbanks Census Area, Alaska, in the United States. It is a tributary of Slate Creek.

Prospectors likely coined the name which first appeared on a government map in 1902.

== See also ==
- List of rivers of Alaska
