= A Christmas Carol (disambiguation) =

A Christmas Carol is an 1843 novella by Charles Dickens.

A Christmas Carol, Christmas Carol, or The Christmas Carol may also refer to:

== Film ==
- A Christmas Carol (1908 film), a silent film starring Thomas Ricketts
- A Christmas Carol (1910 film), a silent film starring Marc McDermott
- A Christmas Carol (1938 film), a film starring Reginald Owen
- A Christmas Carol (1951 film), the American alternative title of Scrooge, a British film starring Alastair Sim
- A Christmas Carol (1960 film), a British theatrical short
- A Christmas Carol (1997 film), an animated musical feature film
- Christmas Carol: The Movie, a 2001 animated film starring Kate Winslet, Nicolas Cage and Michael Gambon
- A Christmas Carol (2006 film), an animated film
- A Christmas Carol (2009 film), a film by Robert Zemeckis and starring Jim Carrey
- A Christmas Carol (2020 film), a drama dance film directed by Jacqui Morris and David Morris
- Christmas Carol (2022 film), a South Korean thriller

== Television ==
- The Christmas Carol, a 1949 TV special starring Taylor Holmes
- "A Christmas Carol" (Shower of Stars), a 1954 installment of Shower of Stars
- A Christmas Carol (TV special), a 1971 animated short film starring Alastair Sim
- An American Christmas Carol, a 1979 television feature starring Henry Winkler
- A Christmas Carol (1982 film), an Australian animated television feature
- A Christmas Carol (1984 film), a television feature starring George C. Scott
- "Christmas Carol" (The X-Files), a 1997 episode
- A Christmas Carol (1999 film), a television feature starring Patrick Stewart
- A Christmas Carol (2000 film), a television feature starring Ross Kemp
- A Christmas Carol (2004 film), a musical television feature starring Kelsey Grammer
- "A Christmas Carol" (Doctor Who), a 2010 Christmas special
- A Christmas Carol (TV series), a 2019 television drama starring Guy Pearce

== Theatre ==
- A Christmas Carol (1988 play), a stage performance by Patrick Stewart
- A Christmas Carol (musical), a 1994 Alan Menken musical
- A Christmas Carol (2017 play), a stage adaptation by Jack Thorne
- A Christmas Carol: A Ghost Story, a stage adaptation by Mark Gatiss

== Other uses ==
- "In the Bleak Midwinter" or "A Christmas Carol", a poem and carol by Christina Rossetti
- Christmas Carols (album), a 1953 release by Mantovani and His Orchestra
- Christmas carol, a type of song sung at Christmas

== See also ==
- Adaptations of A Christmas Carol
- Scrooge (disambiguation)
