= Tale, Maharashtra =

Village in Maharashtra

Coordinates: 14°26′N 74°52′E

Tale
- Village
- Interactive map of Tale
- Country: India
- State: Maharashtra

Tale, Maharashtra is a small village in Ratnagiri district, Maharashtra state in Western India. The 2011 Census of India recorded a total of 1,352 residents in the village. Tale, Maharashtra's geographical area is approximately 999 hectares (2,470 acres).
