= Nelly Cootalot: Spoonbeaks Ahoy! =

2007 video game

- Developer: Alasdair Beckett-King
- Composer: Mark Lovegrove
- Series: Nelly Cootalot
- Engine: Adventure Game Studio
- Platform: Windows
- Release: March 6, 2007
- Genre: Point-and-click adventure
- Mode: single-player

Nelly Cootalot: Spoonbeaks Ahoy! is a point-and-click adventure game by British developer Alasdair Beckett-King. It was created as an indie game using the Adventure Game Studio game engine and released for free on the Internet on March 6, 2007. The game has been translated into Spanish, French, German and Polish. A sequel to the game, Nelly Cootalot: The Fowl Fleet, was released on March 22, 2016.

== Overview ==
A screenshot of the game, with Nelly on the left

Spoonbeaks Ahoy! was created by Beckett as a gift for his girlfriend, and the pirate protagonist Nelly Cootalot is modelled after her. In the fictional, insular Barony of Meeth, the player investigates the disappearance of a fleet of spoonbeaks (the game's term for spoonbills). A few minigames must be completed to reach the ending, including deciphering a coded message and winning a "hook a duck" carnival game.

The game's ending scene alludes to a potential sequel, which development was officially announced by Beckett in September 2008. The second game is called Nelly Cootalot II: The Fowl Fleet. It was crowdfunded via Kickstarter and released in March 2016 commercially.

== Reception ==
The game was praised for its story, music and humorous setting, though a few puzzles were considered difficult. While reviewers felt the game was inspired by Monkey Island series for its setting and dialogues, they acknowledge the originality of its art style and play experience. It was rated 80 out of 100 by the magazine PC Format.

The game won five AGS Awards in 2007, namely "Best Game Created with AGS", "Best Gameplay", "Best Dialogue Writing", "Best Player Character", and "Best Character Art". It was also named one of the 20 "Best Freeware Adventure Games" of 2007 by Think Services' IndieGames.com.
