= Christmas Day (disambiguation) =

Christmas Day refers to the day of December 25, commonly known as simply Christmas.

It may also refer to:

== Music ==
- "Christmas Day" (Squeeze song)
- "Christmas Day" (Michael W. Smith song)
- "Christmas Day", a song from the musical Promises, Promises
- "Christmas Day", a song by The Beach Boys from The Beach Boys' Christmas Album
- "Christmas Day", a song by Dido from Platinum Christmas
- "Christmas Day", a song by MxPx from Punk Rawk Christmas
- "Christmas Day", a song by Ian Kelly (songwriter), released in 2014
- "Christmas Day", a song by Thunder (band), released in 2017

== See also ==
- Christmas Day (horse): Irish thoroughbred racehorse
- Christmas Day Plot, a conspiracy made by the Indian revolutionary movement
- Christmas Day in the Morning, the first of several Christmas albums by Burl Ives
- Christmas Day (Trading) Act 2004, an Act of Parliament of the Parliament of the United Kingdom
- "Xmas Day" (song), by Sevendust
- Xmasday, an album by Hue and Cry
