= White Christmas =

White Christmas most commonly refers to:

- White Christmas (weather), snowfall or snow-covered ground on Christmas Day
- "White Christmas" (song), a 1942 song written by Irving Berlin

White Christmas may also refer to:

== Film, television, and theatre ==
- White Christmas (film), a 1954 musical film
  - White Christmas (soundtrack), the soundtrack to the 1954 film
  - White Christmas (musical), a 2004 stage musical based on the film
- White Christmas (TV series), a 2011 South Korean television series
- "White Christmas" (Black Mirror), the 2014 Christmas special of Black Mirror
- "White Christmas" (Modern Family), a 2015 episode of Modern Family

== Music ==
- White Christmas (Peter Andre album) (2015)
- Irving Berlin's White Christmas, a 1954 album by Rosemary Clooney
- White Christmas (Pat Boone album) (1959)
- White Christmas (Rosemary Clooney album) (1996)
- Merry Christmas (Bing Crosby album) or White Christmas (1954)
- White Christmas (Al Green album) (1986)
- White Christmas (Martina McBride album) (1998)

== Other uses ==
- White Christmas (food), an Australian dessert
- White Christmas (Warner Bros. Movie World), a night-time event held at Warner Bros. Movie World
