= Walter Kirchhoff =

German opera singer (1879–1951)

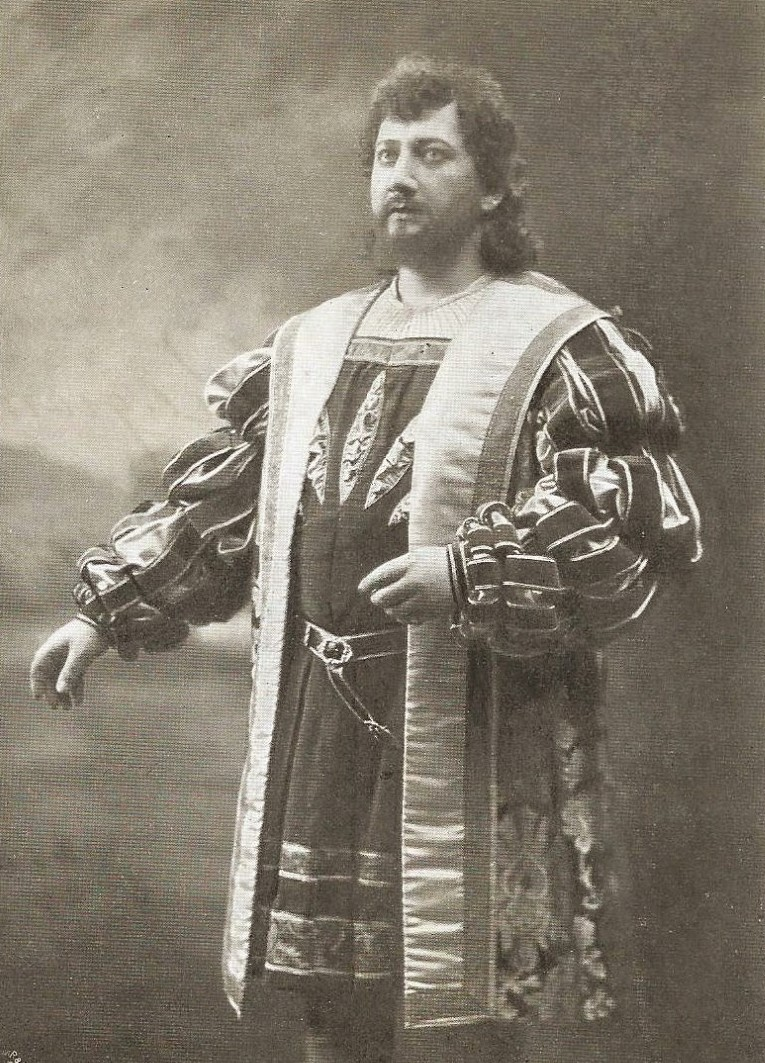
- Walter Kirchhoff as Faust in 1908.
- Born: 17 March 1879; Berlin, German Empire
- Died: 26 or 29 March 1951 (aged 72) (Note: Sources disagree about the date of his death. The official death record, issued 30 March 1951, gives the time of death as between 4 and 6 p.m. on 29 March 1951. The 1960 encyclopedia by Kosch also gives 29 March. Most later biographies give the date as 26 March, without mentioning or explaining the discrepancy.); Wiesbaden, Hesse, West Germany
- Occupations: Operatic tenor; Military officer
- Organizations: Berlin Royal Opera; Imperial German Army; Metropolitan Opera

Walter Kirchhoff (born Walther August Kirchhoff; 17 March 1879 – 26 or 29 March 1951) was a German tenor who had an active international career in operas and concerts from 1906 through 1934.

Prior to his career as an opera singer, he was a military officer in the cavalry division of the Imperial German Army. He later served Wilhelm, German Crown Prince as an adjutant during World War I while working as a resident artist at the Berlin Royal Opera where he had a lengthy performance career that spanned from 1906 through 1932. Kirchhoff was particularly celebrated for his performances in the operas of Richard Wagner. He sang leading roles at several prominent opera houses and festivals globally including the Bayreuth Festival, the Royal Opera House in London, the Teatro Colón, and the Vienna Court Opera. From 1926 to 1931 he was a leading tenor at the Metropolitan Opera in New York City. He finished his career as a resident artist at the Deutsches Opernhaus in 1933–1934. After retiring from the stage, he taught on the voice faculty of the Klindworth-Scharwenka Conservatory in Berlin, and was also active in that city as a theatre director and talent agent.

== Early life and education ==
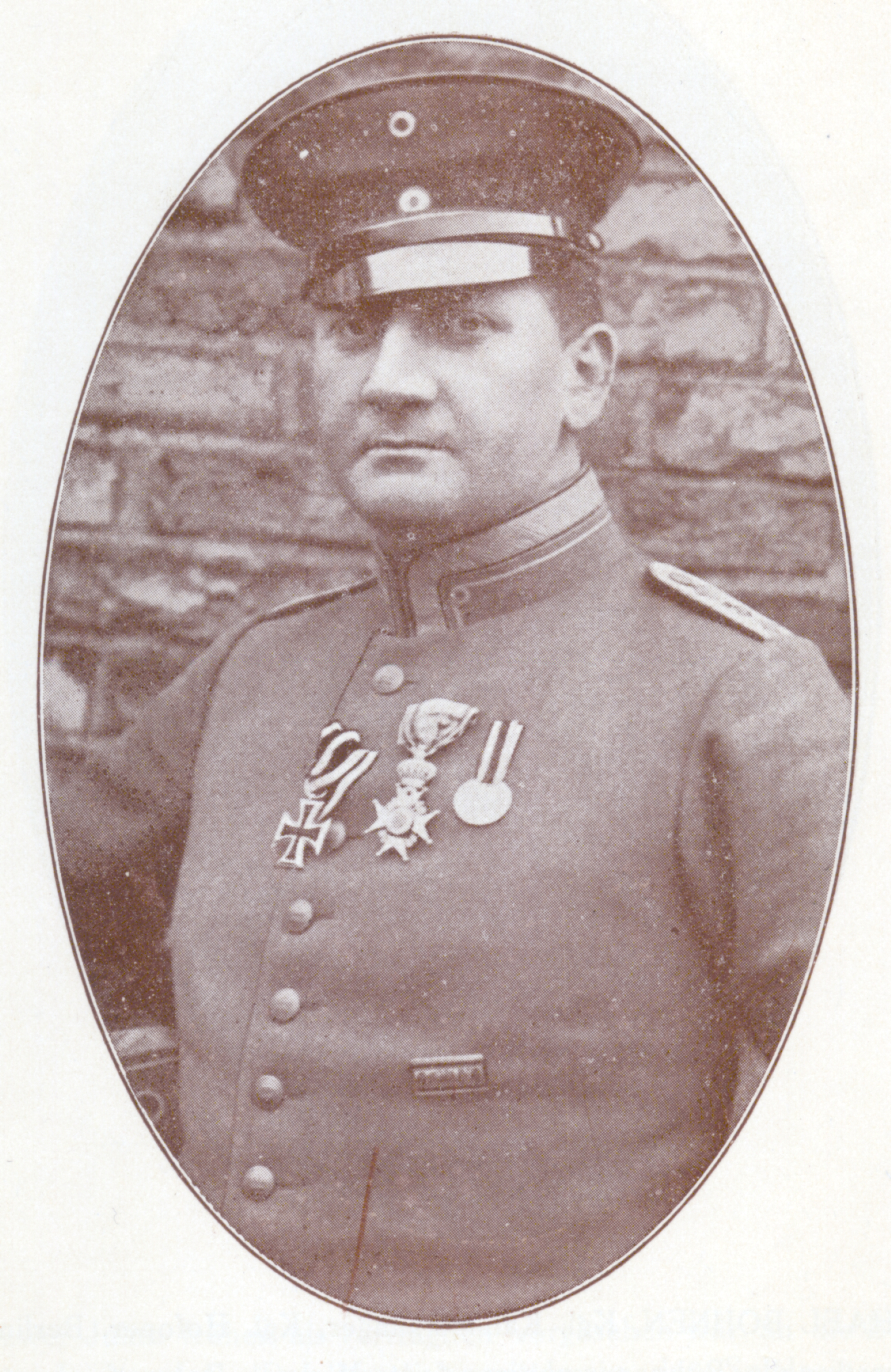
Walter Kirchhoff in uniform during World War I.

Walter Kirchhoff was born in Berlin on 17 March 1879. Before training as a vocalist he served as a military officer in the cavalry division of the Imperial German Army. He later resumed a military career during World War I, serving as an adjutant to Wilhelm, German Crown Prince while continuing to sing on the Berlin stage.

Walter Kirchhoff studied singing in Berlin with Lilli Lehmann and Eugen Robert Weiss, training under these teachers after being advised to do so by Georg von Hülsen-Haeseler. He later studied singing further in Milan.

== Performance career ==
Walter Kirchhoff made his stage debut in the title role of Gounod's Faust at the Berlin Royal Opera in 1906. He was a resident artist at that company for the next fourteen years, appearing without interruption through 1920. He later returned in 1923–1924, 1928–1929, and 1932.

In 1910, Kirchhoff starred in the world premiere of Arthur Nevin's controversial opera Poia. He excelled there in the stage works of Richard Wagner with his repertoire including Siegmund in Die Walküre, Tristan in Tristan und Isolde, and the title roles in Lohengrin, Siegfried, and Tannhäuser. His other repertoire included Alfonso in Korngold's Violanta, the King's Son in Humperdinck's Königskinder, and Menelaus in R. Strauss's Die ägyptische Helena. In 1911 he sang the title role in Handel's oratorio Judas Maccabaeus with the Berlin Philharmonic under conductor Siegfried Ochs with a chorus of 600 voices. That same year he made his debut at the Bayreuth Festival as Walther von Stolzing in Wagner's Die Meistersinger von Nürnberg, a role he repeated at Bayreuth in 1912. He sang again at Bayreuth in 1913 and 1914, notably the title role in Parsifal for his final appearance at that festival.

Kirchhoff was a guest artist at the Dutch National Opera in 1912–1913, portraying the King's Son in Königskinder and Tannhäuser. He portrayed Walther von Stolzing again for his debut at the Royal Opera House (ROH), Covent Garden, in 1913. He later returned to the ROH in 1924 as Loge in Das Rheingold. In 1922 he portrayed the roles of Siegfried and Loge in the first presentation of the complete Ring cycle at the Teatro Colón in Buenos Aires. In 1923 he performed the role of Tristan in Tristan und Isolde at the Solís Theatre in Montevideo.

Kirchhoff was a leading tenor at the Metropolitan Opera (Met) in New York City from 1926 to 1931. In 1929 he performed the role of Max in the United States premiere of Krenek's Jonny spielt auf at the Met. He also sang in the United States premiere of Violanta at the Met in 1927, and performed in the Met's first staging of Boccaccio in 1931. He was simultaneously committed to the Vienna Court Opera in 1927–1928. During his career he also starred in leading roles as a guest artist at La Monnaie and the Paris Opera. He ended his career at the Deutsches Opernhaus where he was a resident artist in 1933–1934.

== Marriage and later life ==
Walter Kirchhoff married the daughter of Hungarian soprano Etelka Gerster. He joined the voice faculty of the Klindworth-Scharwenka Conservatory in Berlin in 1934 where he taught for several years. He also worked as a talent agent and theatre director in Berlin.

Walter Kirchhoff died on 26 or 29 March 1951 in Wiesbaden.
