= Alasdair Beckett-King =

British stand-up comedian, writer, and actor (born 1984)

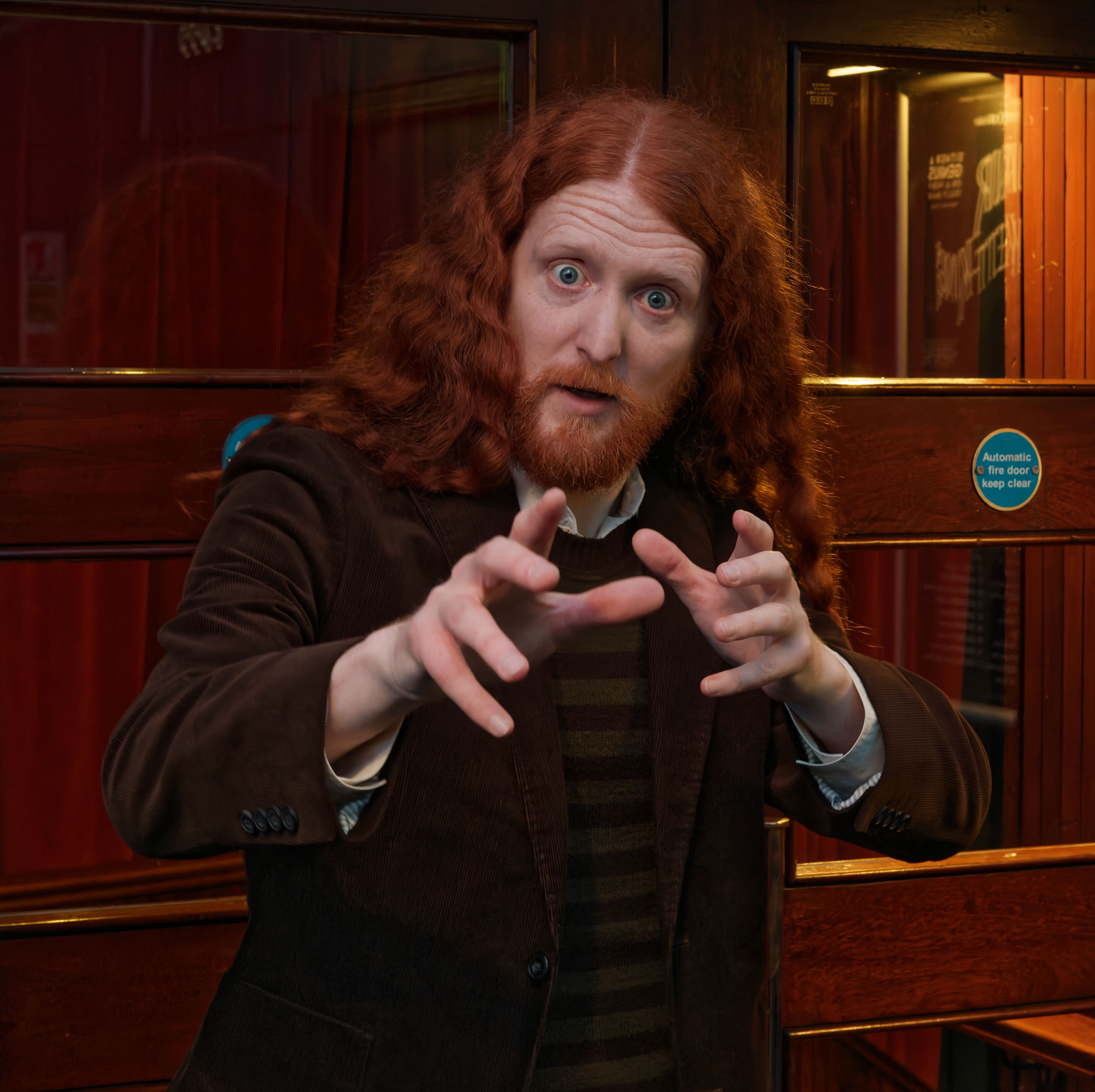
- Beckett-King at the Leicester Square Theatre in London during his King Of Crumbs tour, 2026
- Born: 31 March 1984 (age 42)
- Education: London Film School
- Occupations: Stand-up comedian; programmer; actor; author
- Years active: 2012–present

YouTube information
- Channel: Alasdair Beckett-King
- Years active: 2019–present
- Subscribers: 363 thousand
- Views: 78.14 million
- Last updated: 30 December 2025
- Website: abeckettking.com

Alasdair James Beckett-King (born 31 March 1984) is a British stand-up comedian, writer, and actor. He won the Leicester Mercury Comedian of the Year in 2017 and Chortle's Breakthrough Comedian of the Year in 2023.

== Early life ==
Beckett-King's father is from Manchester and his mother from Scotland, and he grew up in County Durham. He holds an MA in filmmaking from the London Film School, graduating in 2012.

== Career ==
Beckett-King began performing stand-up comedy when graduating from film school. He was listed among finalists of the So You Think You're Funny? comedy tournament in 2013. He also reached the final of NATYS: New Acts of the Year Show in 2014.

Beckett-King won the 2017 Leicester Mercury Comedian of the Year.

Beckett-King has appeared on The Comedian's Comedian with Stuart Goldsmith and Unforeseen Incidents. He co-hosts the Loremen podcast with James Shakeshaft and Eleanor & Alasdair Read That with comedian Eleanor Morton.

Beckett-King created the adventure games Nelly Cootalot: Spoonbeaks Ahoy!, released in 2007, and Nelly Cootalot: The Fowl Fleet, released in 2016. He also wrote the script for the adventure game Unforeseen Incidents, released in 2018.

Since 2019, he publishes comedy sketches, which are written, acted, produced and animated by himself, on his YouTube channel.

In 2022, Beckett-King voiced the character of "The Floater" in Doctor Who: Redacted, produced by BBC Studios. He won the award for Breakthrough Act in the 2023 Chortle Awards.

Beckett-King is an occasional panellist on Mock the Week, the British comic news quiz show, most notably appearing in the show's final episode on BBC Two. He reappeared on the show's revival series on TLC. He is the host of the BBC Radio 4 comedy series Wing It!.

He created the children's book series Montgomery Bonbon.
