= The Tale (short story) =

- Short story by Joseph Conrad
- Country: United Kingdom
- Language: English

Publication
- Published in: Strand Magazine
- Publication date: October 1917

"The Tale" is a work of short fiction by Joseph Conrad, first published in the Strand Magazine in October 1917. The story was collected in Tales of Hearsay in 1925 by T. Fisher Unwin.

== Plot ==
A British gentleman and a lady are sharing a romantic interlude. A military man, he is on leave from his duty station during wartime. She insists that he tell her a tale. Bemused by her request, he offers her a war story. It is told not as a personal narrative, but from a third-person point-of-view. The focal character, though never explicitly identified, is he. During the early months of World War I, a British naval auxiliary vessel - a former luxury recreational boat converted to serve in coastal waters - is on patrol. German U-boats are known to be active in the area, destroying domestic shipping. The captain and his mate discover some curious debris floating near the shore. The object has a barrel-like shape suggesting it may be a container used by neutral war profiteers to resupply German submarines with petrol. The officers suspect that it has been hastily abandoned. Suddenly, a dense fog bank engulfs their ship. As visibility diminishes, the captain orders his vessel to cautiously enter a secluded cove and to anchor there until the fog clears.

Entering the cove, the crew discovers that another vessel is occupying the inlet. They missed colliding with the boat by less than 150 feet (50 meters) in the mist. The anchored vessel, barely visible at the entrance to the cove, had not sounded its bell at their approach, a breach of maritime protocol. The captain sends an officer to board the vessel to determine its identity. She is a “coaster”, a small cargo vessel bearing genuine Scandinavian registration, carrying merchandise to an English port. Its bills of lading are in perfect order. The officer is told by its captain that they had anchored due to engine problems. Strangely, the boat's engines have a full head of steam, as if the vessel was prepared to flee. Troubled by this contradiction, and suspecting that the vessel may be resupplying German U-boats, the British captain boards the coaster himself to interview its captain.

The tall, impressive looking Nordic captain invites the British captain into his chart-room. His appearance suggests he may be recovering from a recent drinking binge, but is nonetheless coherent and articulate. He launches into an utterly plausible explanation of his presence in the cove, an explanation that is told earnestly and in detail. He points out that no evidence has been produced to indicate his activities are suspect: he reminds the British officer that he is legally providing goods to England during wartime.

The British commander is certain that he is being lied to. He confronts the trader with his conviction that a resupply operation serving German submarines is underway in the vicinity. The Scandinavian appears to be astonished by this intelligence. The British naval officer adds that shooting war profiteers is too good for them. The Nordic captain reminds him that without evidence, no charges can be made against him.

The British commander quickly comes to a decision: he orders the trading vessel to leave the cove immediately, despite the dense fog. The Nordic captain protests, insisting that he is entirely ignorant of the local waters. The British captain provides him with the precise bearing and distance required to clear the coast safely. Several miles from shore, the Scandinavian vessel strikes a hazardous rock shoal, tearing open its hull and sinking the ship. The entire crew perishes.

When he discovers wreckage from the vessel, the British captain knows that the Nordic captain was truthful when he insisted that he knew nothing of the waters, but the tragedy does not prove his innocence. The narrator reflects: “I don’t know whether I have done stern retribution - or murder…I shall never know.”

== Theme ==
“The Tale” is the story of a British naval officer during WWI who acts on a visceral impulse to test the assumed perfidy of a suspected war profiteer. Biographer Jocelyn Baines describes the theme of “The Tale” as “exceptionally ambiguous” raising the question: During war-time, that a naval officer is warranted in acting extrajudicially when a neutral merchant is suspected of trading with the enemy. In this case, supplying U-boats with fuel to facilitate their destruction of military and civilian shipping. Baines quotes from the story concerning this “particularly despicable form of commerce” involving:

…the murderous stealthiness of methods and the atrocious callousness of complexities that seemed to taint the very source of men’s deep emotions and noblest activities…the air of the chart-room [on suspected ship] was thick with guilt and falsehood braving the discovery, defying simple right, common decency, all humanity of feeling, every scruple of conduct…

Finding the presumed deceit of the merchant captain intolerable, the British commander permits the vessel to depart, but poisons it by offering a false escape route that leads directly onto dangerous shoals. When the Nordic captain, who is indeed ignorant of the local waters, follows the course, he, his crew and vessel are destroyed. Here lies the moral ambiguity in the British captain's self-righteous behavior. Literary critic Laurence Graver notes Conrad's “impoverished technique” in handling his theme:

As he moves into the story itself, the narrator…emphasizes his hatred for duplicity, his nostalgia for a world in which loyalties are more serviceable, and his inability to probe the consequences of his final action…the narrator, so obsessed with the enfeebling power of treachery, drains all force from an occasional homily on the need for Frankness, Sincerity and Passion.”

Graver adds that Conrad, “through narrative sophistication and insistent symbolism, makes more claims for greater suggestiveness than the story [can] actually embody.”

== Sources ==
- Baines, Jocelyn. 1960. Joseph Conrad: A Critical Biography, McGraw-Hill Book Company, New York. ISBN 978-0297167556
- Graver, Laurence. 1969. Conrad's Short Fiction. University of California Press, Berkeley, California. ISBN 0-520-00513-9
