= Christmas (disambiguation) =

Christmas is a public holiday in most countries celebrated on December 25.

Christmas may also refer to:

== Places ==
=== Australia ===
- Christmas Island, a territory of Australia in the Indian Ocean
- Christmas Island (Tasmania), one of the group of New Year Islands

=== Canada ===
- Christmas Island, Nova Scotia, an island within the Bras D'Or Lakes, Nova Scotia, Canada

=== United States ===
- Christmas, Arizona, an uninhabited mining community
- Christmas, Florida, a small town
- Christmas, Michigan, a small community
- Christmas, Mississippi, an unincorporated community
- Christmas Valley, Oregon, an unincorporated community

== Music ==
- Christmas, a 1983–early 1990s American rock band featuring members of Combustible Edison

=== Albums ===
- Christmas (Alabama album), 1985
- Christmas (Bill Anderson album), 1969
- Christmas (Francesca Battistelli album), 2012
- Christmas, by Till Brönner, 2021
- Christmas (Michael Bublé album), 2011
- Christmas (Cher album), 2023
- Christmas (Bruce Cockburn album), 1993
- Christmas, by Mark Feehily, 2017
- Christmas, by the Gothard Sisters, 2010
- Christmas (Hillsong album), 2001
- Christmas (Chris Isaak album), 2004
- Christmas (Jorma Kaukonen album), 1996
- Christmas (Kevin Kern album), 2012
- Christmas (Kimberley Locke album), 2007
- Christmas (Mannheim Steamroller album), 1984
- Christmas (Don McLean album), 1991
- Christmas (Stephanie Mills album), 1991
- Christmas, by Don Moen, 1990
- Christmas (The Oak Ridge Boys album), 1982
- Christmas (Old Man Gloom album), 2004
- Christmas (Elaine Paige album), 1986
- Christmas, by Jill Phillips, 2010
- Christmas, by Plus One, 2002
- Christmas (Johnny Reid album), 2009
- Christmas (Rockapella album), 2000
- Christmas (Kenny Rogers album), 1981
- Christmas (Rebecca St. James album), 1997
- Christmas (Michael W. Smith album), 1989
- Christmas (Sons of the San Joaquin album), 1998
- Christmas (Sparrow Records album), 1988
- Christmas (Jaci Velasquez album), 2001
- Christmas (Clay Walker album), 2002
- Christmas: God With Us, by Jeremy Camp, 2012
- Christmas... From the Realms of Glory, by Bebo Norman, 2007
- Christmass (album), by Frank Black, 2006

=== EPs ===
- Christmas (Creeper EP), 2017
- Christmas (Delta Goodrem EP), 2012
- Christmas (Jesu EP), 2010
- Christmas (Low EP), 1999
- Christmas (Pet Shop Boys EP), 2009
- Christmas, by Bryan Adams, 2019
- Christmas, by Jimmy Eat World, 2004
- The Christmas EP, by Hey Monday, 2011

=== Songs ===
- "Christmas" (song), by The Who from Tommy, 1969
- "Christmas (Baby Please Come Home)", by Darlene Love, 1963; covered by many performers
- "Christmas", by Lil Gotit from Hood Baby, 2018
- "Christmas", from the musical Avenue Q

== People named Christmas ==
- Christmas (surname), a surname (and list of people with that surname)
- Christmas Evans (1766–1838), Welsh nonconformist minister
- Christmas Humphreys (1901–1983), British barrister, judge, Shakespeare scholar, and Buddhist
- Earle Christmas Grafton Page (1880–1961), Australian prime minister

== Fictional characters ==
- Christmas, a fictional character in Kurau Phantom Memory
- Christmas Jones, a fictional character in the 1999 James Bond film The World Is Not Enough
- Chrissy Snow or Christmas Snow, a fictional character played by Suzanne Somers in Three's Company

== Literature ==
- "Christmas", an 1820 short story from The Sketch Book of Geoffrey Crayon, Gent., by Washington Irving
- Christmas, a 1907 anthology edited by Robert Haven Schauffler
- Christmas: A Story, a 1912 novel by Zona Gale
- Christmas, a Happy Time, a 1832 novel by Alicia Catherine Mant
- Christmas, a 1968 non-fiction book by William Sansom

== Television episodes ==
- "Christmas" (Brooklyn Nine-Nine), 2013
- "Christmas" (Divorce), 2016
- "Christmas" (The Middle), 2009
- "Christmas" (My Hero), 2000

== See also ==
- Christmas carol
- Christmas beetle, Australian genus of beetle (Anoplognathus)
- Christmas Bird Count, a census of birds in the Western Hemisphere
- Christmas Bowl, an annual Japanese American high school football championship game
- Christmas Bullet, an aircraft
- Christmas Christmas, a 2017 album
- Christmas Day (disambiguation)
- Christmas Eve (disambiguation)
- Christmas Hills, Victoria, a town in Victoria, Australia
- Christmas Island (disambiguation)
- Christmas and holiday season
- Christmas lights
- Christmas music
- Christmas tree
- Christmas worldwide
- Christmas truce, a list of truces during World War I
- Christmastide, a season in the liturgical year of most Christian denominations
- Factor IX or Christmas factor, a blood clotting protein
- Haemophilia B or Christmas disease
- Category:Christmas
- Merry Christmas (disambiguation)
- White Christmas (disambiguation)
- Xmas (disambiguation)
