= Nash (surname) =

Nash is a surname of Irish, English and Welsh origin. The surname went from "Ash" to "Nash" by colloquialism, and was established from an early date in Ireland and Wales, with an etymology meaning ash or 'near' the ash tree. Nash as the Americanization of similar sounding Jewish surnames has also been proposed. A similar word, Nahash, means serpent in Hebrew.

== People ==
- Adam Nash (disambiguation), multiple people
- Albert C. Nash (1826–1890), American architect
- Albert L. Nash (1921–2015), American politician
- Alex Nash (1923–1944), Australian footballer
- Alexander Nash (1849–1906), English footballer
- Alfred George Nash (1853–1930), Jamaican civil engineer
- Anthony Nash (disambiguation), multiple people, various people
- Abner Nash (1740–1786), American politician
- Beau Nash (1674–1762), Anglo-Welsh dandy and leader of fashion
- Bette Nash (1935–2024), American flight attendant
- Bill Nash (footballer) (1882–1962), Australian rules footballer
- Billy Nash (1865–1929), American Major League Baseball player
- Brendan Nash (born 1977), Australian cricketer
- Brian Nash (basketball) (born 1970), American basketball coach
- Brian Nash (musician) (born 1963), English guitarist
- C. Nash (rugby league), Australian rugby league player
- Carlo Nash (born 1973), English footballer
- Charles Nash (disambiguation), multiple people
- Clara Hapgood Nash (1839–1921), American lawyer
- Clarence Nash (1904–1985), American voice actor
- Claude H. Nash (born 1943), American biochemist
- Conor Nash, Irish Australian rules footballer
- Cotton Nash (1942–2023), American professional basketball and baseball player
- David Nash (disambiguation), multiple people
- Diane Nash (born 1938), American civil rights activist
- Dion Nash (born 1971), New Zealand cricket player
- E. B. Nash (1838–1917), American homeopath
- E. J. H. Nash (1898–1982), English clergyman and evangelist
- Eddie Nash (1929–2014), convicted gangster and former nightclub and restaurant owner in Los Angeles, born Adel Gharib Nasrallah
- Edith Nash (1913–2003), American poet and educator
- Edgar Nash (1832–1915), American businessman and politician
- Edward Nash (disambiguation), multiple people
- Edwin Nash (1812–1884), English ecclesiastical architect
- Fiona Nash (born 1965), Australian senator
- Francis Nash (1742–1777), American soldier
- Frank Nash (1887–1933), American bank robber and gangster
- Frank Nash (footballer) (1907–1992), Australian rules footballer
- Frederick Nash (1781–1858), American lawyer and jurist
- Frederick Nash (painter) (1782–1856), English painter
- Gary B. Nash (1933–2021), American historian
- Ged Nash (born 1975), Irish politician
- George K. Nash (1842–1904), American politician
- George Valentine Nash (1864–1921), American botanist
- Gerald Ewart Nash (1896–1976), Canadian World War I flying ace
- Graham Nash (born 1942), British singer-songwriter
- Harold Nash (born 1970), American football player and coach
- Harold L. Nash (1892–1975), American engineer and politician
- Heddle Nash (1894–1961), English singer and renowned lyric tenor
- Helen Elizabeth Nash (1921–2012), American pediatrician
- Henry Nash (1869–1902), American pioneer and soldier
- Henry K. Nash (1817–1897), American politician from North Carolina
- Jack Nash (disambiguation), multiple people
- James Nash (disambiguation), multiple people
- Jason Nash (born 1973), American actor and comedian
- Jessika Nash (born 2004), Australian footballer
- Jim Nash (disambiguation), multiple people
- Joe Nash (born 1960), American football player
- John Nash (disambiguation), multiple people
- Jørgen Nash (1920–2004), Danish artist and writer
- Joseph Nash (1809–1878), English watercolor painter and lithographer
- Joseph Nash (footballer), English footballer
- Kate Nash (born 1987), English singer-songwriter
- Kateřina Nash (born 1977), Czech cross-country skier and cyclist
- Katherine Nash (1910–1982), American sculptor
- Kevin Nash (born 1959), retired American professional wrestler
- Knowlton Nash (1927–2014), Canadian newscaster
- Le'Bryan Nash (born 1992), American player in the Israeli Basketball Premier League
- Leigh Nash (born 1976), American singer and composer
- Leroy Nash (1915–2010), American criminal
- Lewis Nash (born 1958), American jazz drummer
- Lewis H. Nash (1852–1923), American engineer
- Malcolm Nash (1945–2019), Welsh cricket player and coach
- Martin Nash (born 1975), Canadian soccer player and coach, brother of Steve Nash
- Mary Louise Nash (1826–1896), American educator and writer
- Matthew Nash (born 1981), Australian soccer player and coach
- Michael Nash (disambiguation), multiple people
- N. Richard Nash (1913–2000), American writer and dramatist
- Nick Nash (born 1999), American football player
- Niecy Nash (born 1970), American comedian, actress and television personality
- Ogden Nash (1902–1971), American poet
- Paul Nash (artist) (1889–1946), British painter
- Peggy Nash (born 1951), Canadian politician
- Pharell Nash (born 2008), Dutch footballer
- Philip Nash (1906–1982), English civil servant
- Philleo Nash (1909–1987), American government official and educator
- Richard Nash (disambiguation), multiple people
- Robert Nash (disambiguation), multiple people
- Roger Nash (born 1942), British-Canadian poet
- Ronald H. Nash (1936–2006), American philosophy professor
- Royston Nash (1933–2016), English-born conductor
- Steve Nash (born 1974), Canadian basketball player
- Su-Elise Nash (born 1981), English singer who rose to fame with Mis-Teeq
- Thomas Nash (disambiguation), multiple people
- Tyson Nash (born 1975), Canadian-born hockey player
- Walter Nash (1882–1968), New Zealand politician
- Warwick Nash (1907–1983), Irish chess master
- William Nash (disambiguation), multiple people

== Fictional characters ==
- Athena Grant Nash, a LAPD sergeant from the American TV series 9-1-1
- Bobby Nash, a LAFD fire captain from the American TV series 9-1-1
- Charlie Nash, from the Street Fighter series
- Ellie Nash, from the Canadian drama Degrassi: The Next Generation
- Martin Nash (The Office), in the American sitcom The Office
- Russell Nash, in the film Highlander

== See also ==
- General Nash (disambiguation), multiple people
- Justice Nash (disambiguation), multiple people
- Senator Nash (disambiguation), multiple people
