= Table talk =

Table talk or Tabletalk may refer to:

- Table Talk (Cape Town), a weekly local newspaper in Cape Town, South Africa
- Table-Talk (Hazlitt) (1821), a collection of essays by the English essayist, critic, and social commentator William Hazlitt
- Table talk (literature), literary genre, a species of memoir
- Table Talk (Luther) (1566), a collection of the sayings of Martin Luther
- Table Talk (magazine), a former weekly magazine published in Melbourne, Australia
- Table Talk Pies, a brand of pies in the United States
- Table Talk (Plutarch), a set of dialogues in Book VIII of Plutarch's Moralia
- Hitler's Table Talk (Tischgespräche im Führerhauptquartier), a series of World War II monologues delivered by Adolf Hitler
- Table Talk, a collection of essays by Samuel Taylor Coleridge (1772-1834), edited by Henry Nelson Coleridge
- "Tabletalk", a song by Adam and the Ants, from the album Dirk Wears White Sox
