= James Nash =

James Nash may refer to:

- James Nash (MP) (died 1400), English politician
- James Nash (prospector) (1834–1913), Australian gold prospector
- Jimmy Nash (1871–1952), New Zealand politician
- James J. Nash (1875–1927), American Medal of Honor recipient
- Jim Nash (footballer) (1914–1984), Australian rules footballer
- James Nash (ecotheologian) (1938–2008), Christian ecotheologian
- Jim Nash (baseball) (born 1945), American baseball player
- Jim Nash (politician) (born 1967), American politician in Minnesota
- James Nash (racing driver) (born 1985), British auto racing driver
- James Nash (bishop) (1862–1943), Anglican Bishop-coadjutor of Cape Town
- James Nash (musician) (born 1973), American guitarist and recording artist
- It is also a jail in Oakden, South Australia

== See also ==
- Nash (surname)
