= William Nash =

William Nash may refer to:

- William Nash (VC) (1824–1875), Irish recipient of the VC
- William Nash (Lord Mayor of London), grocer and politician in 18th century London
- William Nash (Manitoba politician) (1846–1917), lawyer and politician in Manitoba, Canada
- William F. Nash (1847–1916), member of the Wisconsin State Senate
- William Heddle Nash (1894–1961), English lyric tenor
- William L. Nash, U.S. Army general
- William Nash (cricketer) (1884–1971), English cricketer
- William Nash, character in American Yearbook
- Bill Nash (footballer) (1882–1962), Australian rules footballer
- Billy Nash (1865–1929), Major League Baseball third baseman
