= Edward Nash =

Edward Nash may refer to:

- Edward Nash (painter) (1778–1821), English painter, known for his miniatures
- Edward Radcliffe-Nash (1888–1915), English equestrian
- Edward Nash (sportsman) (1902–1985), English cricketer and footballer
- Edward Nash (rugby union) (1853–1932)
- Eddie Nash (1929–2014), American nightclub owner

== See also ==
- Edwin Nash (1813–1884), English ecclesiastical architect
- Ted Nash (disambiguation)
