= John Round =

John or Jack Round may refer to:

- John Round (MP) (1783–1860), Member of Parliament (MP) for Ipswich 1812–1818 and for Maldon 1837–1847
- John Nash Round, English Victorian architect active in the mid-nineteenth-century Kent, England
- John Horace Round (1854–1928), historian and genealogist of medieval England, grandson of the MP
- Jack Round (1903–1936), English footballer
