= Ian Blake =

Ian Blake may refer to:

- Ian Blake (rugby union), played for Kilmarnock RFC
- Ian Blake, character in American Yearbook
- Ian Blake, character in Y Pris
- Ian Blake, pseudonym for singer-songwriter Draco Rosa
