= Charlie Nash =

Charlie Nash may refer to:

- Charlie Nash (boxer) (born 1951), Irish boxer
- Charlie Nash (Street Fighter), a fictional character in the Street Fighter video game series

== See also ==
- Charles Nash (disambiguation)
