= Amanda Hunter =

Amanda Hunter may refer to:

- Amanda Hunter of Hunter-Dawson State Historic Site
- Amanda Hunter, character in American Yearbook
- Jim Holliday, alias Amanda Hunter
