= Specimens of the Table Talk of the Late Samuel Taylor Coleridge =

1835 book

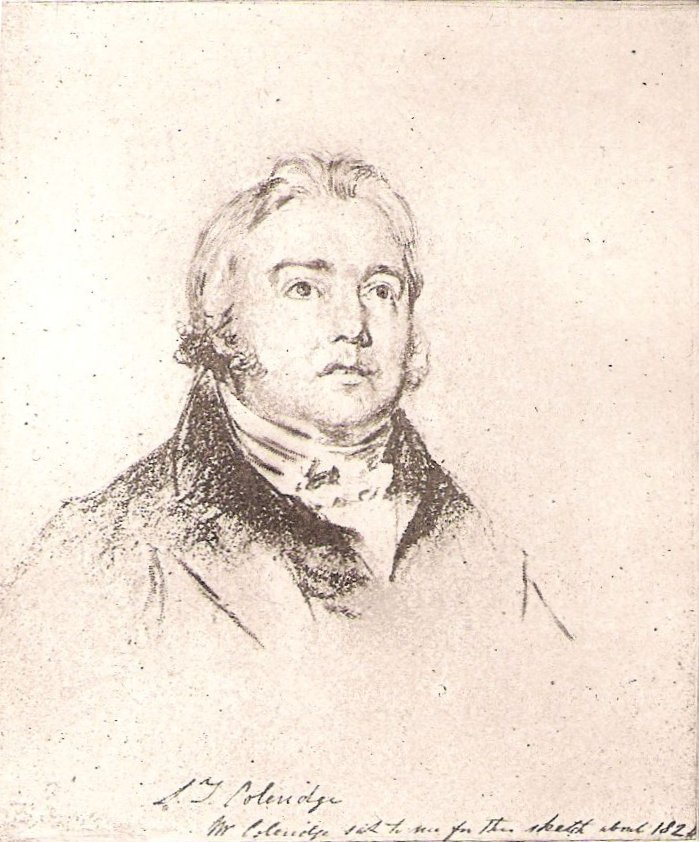
Sketch of Samuel Taylor Coleridge by Charles Robert Leslie, c. 1824

Specimens of the Table Talk of the Late Samuel Taylor Coleridge (1835) is a collection of the English Romantic poet's verbally delivered thoughts, edited by his nephew Henry Nelson Coleridge. S. T. Coleridge was famous in his time for his monologues, as opposed to conversation, on a variety of subjects, but especially on philosophy and religion. Some of his best-known phrases come from this work, such as poetry being "the best words in the best order" and watching Edmund Kean act being "like reading Shakespeare by flashes of lightning". Through the 19th century and beyond this was perhaps the most widely read book by or about Coleridge.

== S. T. Coleridge the talker ==
It has been claimed that "Coleridge the talker is the essential Coleridge, of whom Coleridge the writer of prose, Coleridge the poet and Coleridge the lecturer are somewhat distorted reflections", and that, like Dr Johnson, he was "a man greater than his published works, who...found oral discourse the only completely satisfactory medium for self-expression." For the essayist William Hazlitt this was a fault: "He lays down the pen to make sure of an auditor, and mortgages the admiration of posterity for the stare of an idler." The evidence for his greatness in this field comes from those contemporaries, more than a hundred in number, who left written testimony of it, evaluating him as the greatest talker of his time. As a young and impecunious man he is said, though not on the best authority, to have been offered free lodging by an innkeeper because of the great numbers of customers who were attracted to the inn by his talk. Many years later, ageing and ailing, he was such an object of pilgrimage that Dr James Gillman, in whose care he lived, had to restrict visits to Thursday afternoons and evenings. Those who came to hear him, from many walks of life and from both his own country and abroad, included Thomas Carlyle, Thomas Chalmers, Sir Humphry Davy, Thomas De Quincey, Joseph Farington, William Rowan Hamilton, Lord Hatherley, William Hazlitt, Sir Henry Holland, Thomas Hood, Leigh Hunt, Edward Irving, Lord Jeffrey, John Keats, Charles Lamb, J. G. Lockhart, Harriet Martineau, Thomas Moore, Henry Crabb Robinson, Samuel Rogers, Sir Walter Scott, Robert Southey, John Wilson, William and Dorothy Wordsworth, Washington Allston, James Fenimore Cooper, Ralph Waldo Emerson, Charles Robert Leslie, Emma Willard, Ludwig Tieck, Philarète Chasles, and Gioacchino Prati.

In 1804 his accent was described as being "broad Devonshire", at least by the standards of the gentry, and his voice was somewhat adenoidal. Coleridge himself agreed with the judgement of many who met him that his powers were those of a monologuist rather than a conversationalist. He talked "very much like an angel" according to one witness, while another wrote that "in company, his vehemence of manner and wonderful flow of words and ideas, drew all eyes towards him, and gave him pre-eminence." De Quincey described his "continuous strain of eloquent dissertation, certainly the most novel, the most finely illustrated, and traversing the most spacious fields of thought by transitions the most just and logical, that it was possible to conceive." The dramatist Henry Taylor wrote after meeting Coleridge that "I never knew such a scope of mind exhibited in any man – such largeness of views, together with such subtlety of insight, and a vivid imagination flashing through all"; many years later he recalled that "I could not sleep at nights after hearing him talk." Keats reported that in two miles' walk with Coleridge the elder poet had discoursed on a thousand subjects, and Hazlitt described his management of this variety of topics: "In digressing, in dilating, in passing from subject to subject, he appeared to me to float in air, to slide on ice". But not everyone was enchanted by the experience of listening to Coleridge. Sir Walter Scott recorded in his Journal that "I was never so bethumped with words." Carlyle wrote a famous chapter in his Life of John Sterling analysing Coleridge's style of discourse, which he found a "hazy infinitude of Kantean transcendentalism", and Sir Henry Holland similarly called him "an eloquent but intolerable talker; impatient of the speech and opinion of others; very inconsecutive, and putting forth with a plethora of words misty dogmas in theology and metaphysics, partly of German origin, which he never seemed to me to clear up to his own understanding or to that of others."

== H. N. Coleridge the editor ==
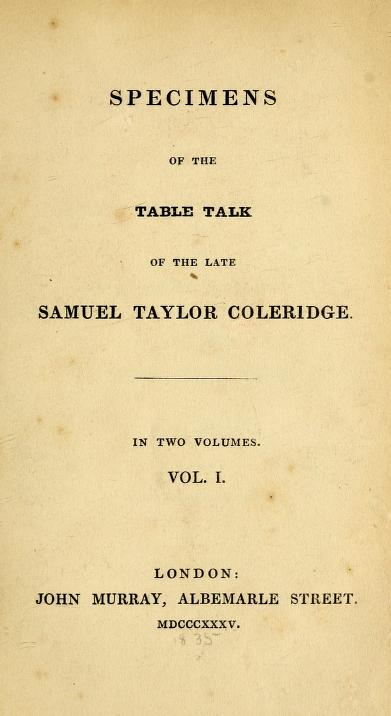
Title page of the first edition

Henry Nelson Coleridge, the poet's nephew, was even as a boy an enthusiast, writing in a school magazine in praise not just of his uncle's poetry, philosophy and criticism but also of his conversation. In December 1822 he began the task of taking down notes of Samuel Taylor Coleridge's table talk, continuing intermittently until 1827, and then again from April 1830 until shortly before the poet's death in July 1834, the last entry being dated 10 July of that year. His note-taking does not appear to have been done while Coleridge was actually speaking, but some time afterwards, and it was not intended to be a verbatim record. There is no evidence that the uncle interested himself in the nephew's project or even that he had any knowledge of its existence. Soon after Samuel Taylor Coleridge's funeral his nephew – by then also his son-in-law, having married his daughter Sara Coleridge – began work on turning his notes into a publishable work. His edited text did not precisely match his own manuscripts, being in particular altered to make it appear that Coleridge's words had been more colloquial and less alloquial than in fact they were. He decided to include some transcripts made by his brother John of Coleridge's conversation on two days in 1811. His preface carried the date 11 May 1835, and less than two weeks later the book was published in two volumes by John Murray. The first US edition, also in two volumes, followed the same year, published by Harper.

== Reception ==
The reviewers in the periodicals, most of whom had also witnessed Coleridge in full flow, expressed divergent opinions. It was welcomed by the British Critic, the Dublin University Magazine, the Monthly Review, the Printing Machine, J. G. Lockhart in the Quarterly Review, William Jerdan in the Literary Gazette and John Abraham Heraud in Fraser's Magazine, though some, like Jerdan, acknowledged that Coleridge was guilty of "dissertating", and of doing so at length. The anonymous reviewer in the Athenaeum believed that "every word uttered by Coleridge on [literature] deserved to be treasured up as fine gold", while warning that "It required almost as comprehensive a mind as his own to follow out his chain of reasoning – his linked subtleties; and no man that ever lived, not Coleridge himself, could have recorded it fully and faithfully two hours after." Herman Merivale, in the Edinburgh Review called him "one of the most eloquent, but least concise and definite of reasoners". He accused him also of plagiarism, while praising Henry Nelson Coleridge's work as editor. Of the outright hostile reviewers, Thomas Perronet Thompson in the Westminster Review called S. T. Coleridge "a Tory sophist...a man of little soul". The Eclectic Review wrote of Henry Nelson Coleridge that "Saturated, himself, with the meanest prejudices, both political and ecclesiastical, he has exhibited his 'dear uncle and father-in-law' as a fiery, coarse, and 'one-sided' declaimer against Whigs and Dissenters."

Opinions of the book expressed privately by those who had heard Coleridge also varied widely. The American artist Charles Robert Leslie, for example, said that he "read over and over again what his nephew has recorded of his conversation, and I can vouch for the exactness with which his manner is preserved in those precious little volumes", while Thomas Carlyle wrote in his journal, "Coleridge's Table Talk: insignificant; yet expressive of Coleridge. A great Possibility – that has not realized itself. Never did I see such apparatus got ready for thinking, and so little thought. He mounts scaffolding, pullies and tackle, gathers all the tools in the neighbourhood, with labour, with noise, demonstration, precept, abuse,– and sets three bricks."

== Later publication history ==
In 1836 Henry Nelson Taylor produced a second edition, published in one volume by Murray. It differed from the first edition in omitting several entries and adding many more, mainly taken from Coleridge's notebooks and marginalia. The third edition was issued by Murray in 1851, and as many as 18 editions appeared up to 1917, the popularity of the Table Talk being during these years arguably greater than that of any other book by or about Coleridge, though it has since declined.

In 1990 a new edition of the Table Talk was edited by Carl Woodring and published as volume 14, bound in two parts, of the Princeton edition of Coleridge's Works. This included 124 pages of introductory matter (reviewed as "excellent...both informative and critical"), the complete text of both Henry Nelson Coleridge's edition and his surviving manuscripts, and records of Coleridge's table talk from numerous other sources. One colleague of Woodring wrote, "The scope of Table Talk required that an editor, after retrieving and reorganizing texts scattered by earlier editors, pursue and give order to Coleridge's far-flung speculations. Carl's success contributed not only to our impression that he knew everything but to the reassuring belief that he could make sense of everything."
