= St Nicholas Church, Sutton, London =

Coordinates: 51°21′45″N 0°11′41″W

St Nicholas Church, Sutton
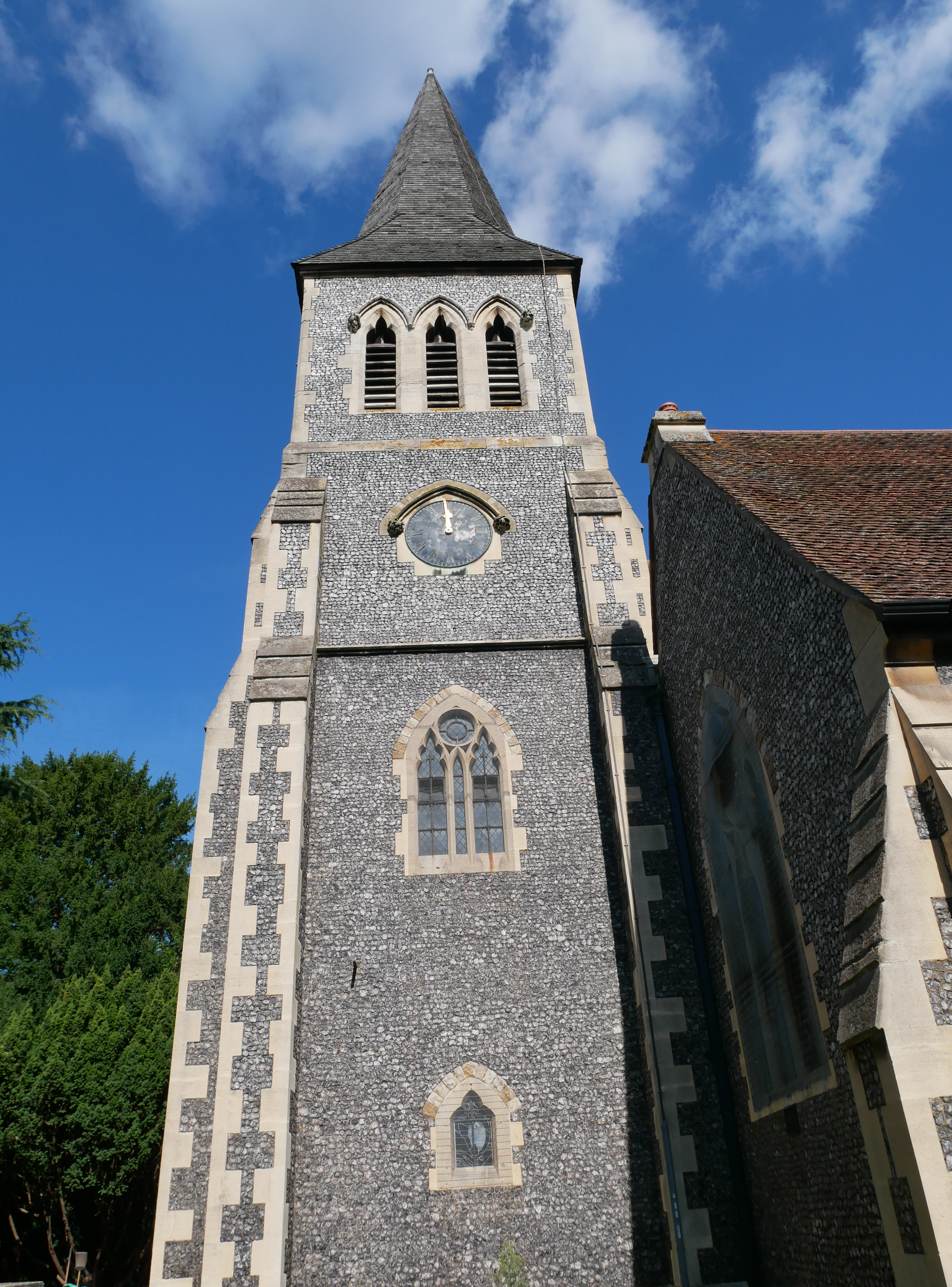

- Location within Sutton
- Country: England
- Denomination: Church of England

Architecture
- Architect: Edwin Nash
- Groundbreaking: 1862
- Completed: 1864

Clergy
- Rector: Rev Frances Arnold

Listed Building – Grade II*
- Designated: 1 March 1974
- Reference no.: 1065629

St Nicholas Church, Sutton, is a Grade II* listed parish church in the centre of Sutton, London. It was built between 1862 and 1864 in the Gothic style with dressed flint and stone dressings. It was designed by the architect Edwin Nash.

== Location ==
St Nicholas - the oldest of the three town centre churches in Sutton - is surrounded by a small ancient graveyard, which is wooded. It also contains some lawned areas with benches. Two well-used public footpaths run through these grounds. It is in ecumenical partnership with other denominations and in a Team Ministry with other Anglican churches.

== History ==
The present building stands on a site that has been used as a church since Saxon times - an earlier, smaller church occupied the site until the nineteenth century, which apart from its piscina was replaced by the present church building, which was consecrated in February 1864. The previous church was stone, and dated mostly from the fourteenth or fifteenth centuries. It had a tower, porch and chancel. Its poor condition, as well as the enlargement of its congregation, necessitated its replacement.

The church suffered slight damage in an air raid in 1940, during the London Blitz. A flying bomb fell near the church and mostly destroyed some of the graves in the churchyard, but the building itself remained largely intact.

== Architectural features ==
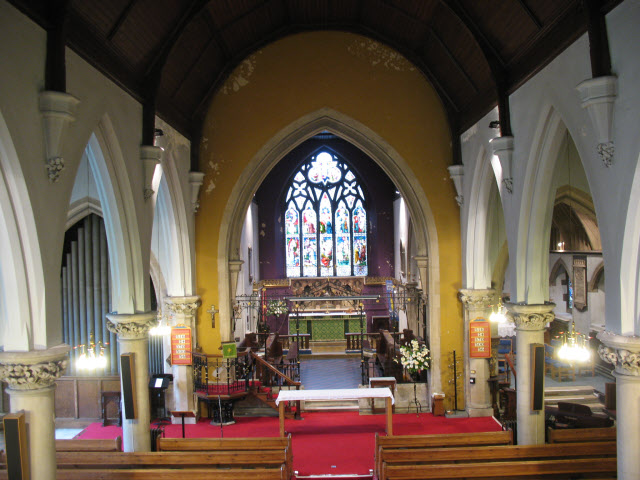
Interior of St Nicholas

The church was rebuilt from an earlier one in 1862-4 by Edwin Nash, incorporating monuments from the old building. It is in the Gothic style. It was constructed with dressed flint and stone dressings. Its roof is of red tile. The entrance is bright blue. It has a four-bay nave, chancel, organ chamber and vestry, side aisles, south aisle chapel and west tower. Its tower has a doorway in its west side, four tiers of fenestration and a shingled broach spire. There are aisle windows of three lights with circular tracery over in pointed heads, two-light windows to the south aisle chapel and a chancel window of five lights. There are gabled porches to the north and south sides; the south porch has the following inscription on its bargeboard: "How amiable are thy dwellings thou Lord of Hosts". Inside the church are a nave with pointed arches supported on circular columns with foliated capitals; timber roofs; and whitewashed walls. The present structure incorporates a medieval piscina, and monuments from the old church including the following: monuments to Sarah Glover (1628), to Lady Dorothy Brownlow (1699), to William Earl Talbot (1782) and to Isaac Littlebury (1740).

== Burials ==
- Dorothy Mason, wife of Sir William Brownlow, 4th Baronet (d. 1700)
- William Talbot, 1st Earl Talbot (1710–1782)

== Notable clergy ==
- Joseph Glover (d. 1638), who died in the crossing to the Massachusetts Bay Colony, and whose wife, Elizabeth Glover, hence introduced the printing press to North America, was Rector of St Nicholas from 1624 to 1636.
