= Giovannie Pico =

American actress

Giovannie Espiritu is a Filipina television, film and stage actress who started her career as medical student Ludlow in 2004-05 episodes of NBC's top-rated hospital drama ER.

A native of Tondo, the poorest district of Manila, and one of the most densely populated areas in the world, Giovannie Anne Cabangis-Espiritu became a performer at a young age and, by her early twenties, starred in a number of Philippine-made internationally produced films and TV programs. She was cast as the female lead in the movie American Yearbook and earned plaudits for her performance, notably because the producers originated the part with a Caucasian actress in mind.

Upon arriving in the United States, Giovannie Pico matriculated at Harvard Law School, intending to study advanced negotiation skills, but the pressures of her show business career constrained to keep her in Hollywood. In addition to her role as ER's Ludlow, she has also appeared on 2007 episodes of Bones (as Rose Allipo) and Gilmore Girls (as Karen). While playing a starring role in the 2006 independently-produced 40-minute TV movie Kambal: The Twins of Prophecy, she received a credit as the film's executive producer. As an activist in the area of domestic violence awareness and prevention, she has donated her time by directing benefit productions of Eve Ensler's play The Vagina Monologues at the Herbst Theater in San Francisco.

2009 - Nominated for Best Supporting Actress at Method Fest (Fiona's Script) alongside Alfre Woodard (American Violet), Theresa Russell (16 to Life), Amy Irving (Adam), and Brooke Johnson (Anytown).

2018 - She can currently be seen as the series lead in the Amazon series, “Dyke Central,” which was featured in After Ellen, BuzzFeed, and Curve Magazine as a top lesbian series to watch.

She has supporting roles in three upcoming movies: a feminist film called, “Solstice,” with Mynah Films; a thriller called, “Cold Pressed,” that was recently released on Amazon Prime; and a pivotal role in the upcoming thriller, “D-Railed” with sci-fi icon Lance Henriksen.

She is the founder of Hollywood Actors Workshop, a school for kids, teens, and adults who are serious about working in film & television. Her students are series regulars, book national campaigns and sign with top agents and managers nationwide.

Giovannie began writing as a way to create more diversity in the film industry and is currently studying at the Upright Citizens Brigade in Hollywood.

Giovannie's parody song, “An Introvert’s World,” reached 3.2 million views when YouTube star Tessa Netting took the lyrics without permission and used them for her own Facebook show, "Me Watching".

In November 2018, she was named as a featured filmmaker/creator for Elizabeth Banks media company, WhoHaHa.
