= Arthur Carnall =

English composer and organist (1852–1904)

Arthur Carnall (1852–1904) was an English composer and organist.

== Biography ==
Arthur Carnall was born on 7 May 1852 in Peterborough, Cambridgeshire to John Carnall (1820–1860) and Rebecca Percival (1825–1903). He was a cathedral chorister at Peterborough. From there he went to the neighbouring cathedral city of Ely as an articled pupil of – and assistant to – the Ely Cathedral organist Dr E. T. Chipp. In 1872 he obtained the degree of Mus.B. from the University of Cambridge.

In the following year, at the age of twenty, he was appointed the organist and choir-master of St John the Evangelist, Penge where he remained for 31 years until his death.

He died on 30 June 1904, at his home in Avington Grove.. His obituary in The Musical Times described him as:

A high-minded man of singularly pure motives and charm of demeanour [...] greatly beloved. He devoted himself to his widowed mother with a rare strength of affection, and after her death, eight months ago, to his invalid brother, George, who, sad to say, survived him only one week. (George Carnall was a chorister at Peterborough Cathedral under Dr. Haydn Keeton (1847–1921) and was organist and choirmaster of Monmouth Grammar School until 1901 when ill-health compelled him to retire.)

== Works ==
Mr. Arthur Carnall gave proof of his creative gifts in an Orchestral Overture, two Quintets (in D and F) for wind instruments, two String Quartets (in C minor and F), a Nocturne for strings, in addition to glees, madrigals, part-songs, anthems, organ and violin pieces, songs, &c. Sadly prophetic was his last composition (unfinished), it being a setting of the words 'I will lay me down in peace and sleep. [Obituary: Arthur Carnall'. The Musical Times, vol. 45, no. 739, 1904]

=== Choir ===
- 1876/1893: Man goeth forth to his Work. Harvest anthem.
- 1876:
  - My Heart was glad: Easter anthem.
  - Hail! thou that art highly favoured.
- 1880: A Wet Sheet & A Flowing Sea. T.T.B.B. Words by Alan Cunningham.
- 1882:
  - Te Deum in A: simple chant.
  - Old Mother Hubbard. S.A.T.B.
  - The Old Couple. T.T.B.B.
- 1885: Come, live with me Madrigal A.T.B.B. Words by Christopher Marlowe.
- 1886: Evening Service in Bb.
- 1888:
  - The Arrow and the Song. T.T.B.B. Words by Longfellow.
  - Hence away, begone. A.T.B.B. Words by Longfellow.
- 1891: The end of the Sabbath: Easter anthem.
- 1892: Christ our Passover. Easter anthem.
- 1894: My heart was glad. Easter anthem.
- 1895:
  - Benedicite in G. No. 3.
  - Vesper Hymn.
- 1898:
  - Evening Service ... in F. No. 2.
  - Give place, you Ladies, and begone! A.T.B.B. Words by John Heywood.
- 1899: Evening Service in C.
- ?1900: Christ our Passover; Easter anthem. (To the choir of St. John's, Penge, S.E.)
- 1903: Bird of the Wilderness. [part song].

=== Cornet ===
- (n.d.): The March of the Boys.

=== Flute ===
- 1897:
  - Bourrée.
  - Tarantella.

=== Organ ===
- 1886:
  - 'Original Melodies'. Series The Vesper Voluntaries: Book 6. 1. Siciliano; 2. Pastorale; 3. Prelude; 4. Moderato; 5. Andante; 6. Minuet; 7. Trio; 8. Adagio; 9. Choral Song; 10. Interlude; 11. Minuet; 12. March; 13. Larghetto; 14. Prelude; 15. Melody.
  - Melody in Bb.

=== Piano ===
- (n.d) March of the Druids.

=== Solo voice ===
- (n.d.)
  - Back From The Fight: voice and piano. Words by Frederic Weatherly.
  - High Tide. Words by Graham Clifton Bingham.
- 1876:
  - The Longer Lyfe.
  - Sweet Contentment. Words by John Chalkhill.
- 1877: Jack's Weddin'. Song. Words by Frederic Weatherly.
- 1878 Lord Roland.
- 1879: My Prentice Lad. Words by Jean Ingelow.
- 1880: An Olden Tryst. Words by Edward Oxenford.
  - Round the Capstan. Words by J. J. Stephenson.
- 1881:
  - Dismasted. Words by Edward Oxenford.
  - The Snow-clad City. Words by 'Clover'.
  - Willow Pattern. Words by Frederic Edward Weatherly.
- 1882: The Little Crossing Sweeper. Words by Louisa Brockman.
- 1883: Love and Trust. Words by A. Brent.
- 1886: Forty Winks. Words by G. Clifton Bingham.
- 1888: The March of the Boys. Words by R. Tissington.

=== Violin ===
- (1897) Four Pieces for Violin and Piano. No. 1. Romance. No. 2. Berceuse. No. 3. Tarantella. No. 4. Gavotte and Musette.
