= Michael Nash =

Michael Nash or Mike Nash may refer to:

- Michael H. Nash (1946–2012), American labor historian and archivist
- Michael L. Nash (fl. 2000s–2020s), American entertainment industry executive
- Michael P. Nash (fl. 2000s–2020s), American film director, screenwriter and producer
- Mike Nash (born 1965), Irish hurler

== See also ==
- Nash (surname)
