= Thomas Nash (Newfoundland) =

Fisherman and historic figure

- Born: c. 1730; Callan, County Kilkenny, Ireland
- Died: 1810
- Occupation: Fisherman

Thomas Nash (c. 1730 – 1810) was an Irish Catholic fisherman who founded Branch, Newfoundland and Labrador.

== Settling in Calvert ==
Nash was born in Callan, County Kilkenny, Ireland, and emigrated to Calvert, Newfoundland and Labrador, formerly known as Capelin Bay, around 1765. He was a planter and lived in an area of Calvert known as the Point and referred to as "Nashes Plantation".

Where Thomas Nash's plantation was originally located in 1773.

Local lore says that Thomas and his sons built a boat over the winter of 1765. Wintering over was not permitted in Newfoundland at that time however when discovered by the fishing admiral the following spring, instead of being punished, Thomas was given a grant of land for the entire shoreline of Calvert. Having sons of an age to assist in building a boat in 1765 would mean that Thomas must have been at least 35 years of age. This is consistent with the letters of Archbishop O'Donel who in 1789 refers to Thomas as an "old planter". Using age 55 to define "old", which is conservative by any standards, would place Thomas's birth year around 1734. It is more likely however that Thomas was closer to 60 in 1789 and therefore born around 1730.

Father Patrick Power, a Roman Catholic priest and Thomas's cousin, fell into an argument with Bishop James Louis O'Donel. Power supposedly started a religious uprising in a neighboring town. After being accused of the riot, O'Donel did not allow Father Power to continue his practices as a priest. This incident made Thomas and his family relocate to what would become in Branch, Newfoundland and Labrador, where he died.

== Establishing branch ==
He first moved to Mosquito Island in Placentia Bay in 1789. In the 1790s, Nash made his way to St. Mary's Bay and found great fishing grounds. It was here that Thomas Nash created a very lucrative salmon and cod fishery. His brothers Tobias and Walter joined him in Branch soon after his fishery in Branch was established. Thomas had seven children, Walter, Thomas, Andrew, Tobias, Patrick, Nora, and Nellie. The Roman Catholic religion and the Nash surname is firmly implanted in the community to this day.

== Extra Sources ==
- Letter Book of the Colonial Secretary's Office, vol. 3, 1759–65, P- 352, V0l- 5, 1771–74, P. 180, PANL; Newfoundland Sessions Court Records, Ferryland, 1789–94, case of Sept. 15, 1770, and case of Sept. 20, 1790, PANL; Cyril J. Byrne, ed., Gentlemen-Bishops and Faction Fighters: The Letters of Bishops O'Donel, Lambert, Scallan and Other Irish Missionaries (St. John's: Jesperson Press, 1984), pp. 62–64, 90-91; John J. Mannion, card files.
- A Place to Belong – Community Order and Everyday Space in Calvert, Newfoundland, Gerard Pocius.
- Irish Settlements in Eastern Canada, John J. Manion.
