= John Taylor Coleridge =

English judge (1790–1876)

The Right Honourable Sir John Taylor Coleridge
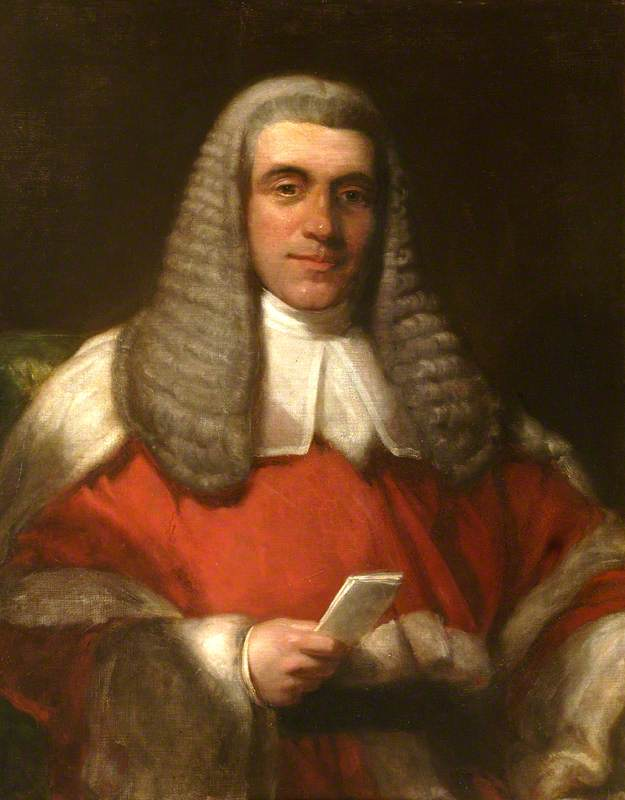
- Sir John Taylor Coleridge by Henry William Pickersgill.

Justice of the Queen's Bench
- In office 26 January 1835 – 14 June 1858

Personal details
- Born: 9 July 1790 Tiverton, Devon, England
- Died: 11 February 1876 (aged 85) Ottery St Mary, Devon, England
- Spouse: Mary Buchanan (m. 1818)
- Parent(s): James Coleridge; Frances Duke Taylor
- Education: Eton College
- Alma mater: Corpus Christi College, Oxford

Sir John Taylor Coleridge (9 July 1790 – 11 February 1876) was an English judge, the second son of Captain James Coleridge and nephew of the poet Samuel Taylor Coleridge.

== Life ==
He was born at Tiverton, Devon, and was educated as a Colleger (King's Scholar) at Eton College, and in 1809 gained a scholarship at Corpus Christi College, Oxford. At Corpus Christi, John Keble became a close friend. Coleridge won the Chancellor's Prize for Latin verse in 1810, graduated first-class in classics in 1812, won the prizes for English and Latin essays in 1813 (as Keble had done in 1811), and became a Vinerian Scholar and a fellow of Exeter College. In 1819 he was called to the bar at the Middle Temple and practised for some years on the western circuit.

In 1824, on William Gifford's retirement, he assumed the editorship of the Quarterly Review, resigning it a year afterwards in favour of John Gibson Lockhart. In 1825 he published a well regarded edition of William Blackstone's Commentaries, and in 1832 he was made a serjeant-at-law and recorder of Exeter. In 1835 he was appointed one of the judges of the King's Bench. In 1852 his university created him a DCL, and in 1858 he resigned his judgeship, and was made a member of the Privy Council, entitling him to sit on the Judicial Committee of the Privy Council. In 1869, he produced his Memoir of the Rev. John Keble, whose friend he had been since their college days, a third edition of which was issued within a year. He died at Ottery St Mary, Devon, leaving two sons and two daughters.

Coleridge was a member of the Canterbury Association from 24 June 1851.

== Leading cases as judge ==
- Stockdale v. Hansard

== Family ==
John married Mary Buchanan at St Peter's, Woodmansterne, Surrey, in 1818; her father, Gilbert Buchanan, was then rector there. They had the following children:

- Mary Dorothy Frances Coleridge (1819), died in infancy
- John Duke Coleridge, 1st Baron Coleridge (1820–1894), Lord Chief Justice
- Henry James Coleridge (1822–1893), Catholic convert, Jesuit, religious writer
- Mary Frances Keble Coleridge (1824–1898)
- Alethea Buchanan Coleridge (1826–1909), married in 1849 John Fielder Mackarness, Bishop of Oxford
- Frederick William Coleridge (1829–1843)

Sir John Taylor Coleridge's brothers were James Duke Coleridge and Henry Nelson Coleridge, the latter the husband of Sara Coleridge. His brother Francis George was the father of Arthur Duke Coleridge (born 1830), clerk of assizes on the Midland circuit and author of Eton in the Forties and whose daughter Mary E. Coleridge became a well-known writer of fiction.
