= John Nash =

John Nash may refer to:

== Arts and entertainment ==
- John Nash (architect) (1752–1835), Anglo-Welsh architect
- John Nash Round (1817–1864), English architect active in the mid-19th-century Kent
- Jolly John Nash (1828–1901), English music hall entertainer
- John Nash (artist) (1893–1977), English painter and engraver
- Johnny Nash (1940–2020), American singer-songwriter

== Politics ==
- John Nash (MP) (1590–1661), English merchant and politician who sat in the House of Commons between 1640 and 1648
- John Nash (Australian politician) (1857–1925), New South Wales politician
- John Nash, Baron Nash (born 1949), British peer, government minister and businessman
- John Henry Nash (politician) (born 1933), South African politician
- John J. Nash (died 1989), Irish Fianna Fáil politician

== Sports ==
- John Nash (footballer) (1867–1939), English footballer
- John Nash (cricket administrator) (1906–1977), English secretary of Yorkshire County Cricket Club, 1931–1971
- John Nash (basketball), American basketball executive
- John Victor Nash (1891–19??), Argentine Olympic bobsledder

== Other ==
- John Forbes Nash Jr. (1928–2015), American mathematician and Nobel laureate
- John Henry Nash (printer) (1871–1947), Canadian-American fine printer and founder of the Twentieth Century Press
- John Nash (priest) (1879–?), Archdeacon of Tuam
- John Francis Nash (1909–2004), American railroad executive

== See also ==
- Jack Nash (disambiguation)
- John Naish
