= Senator Nash =

Senator Nash may refer to:

- Abner Nash (1740–1786), North Carolina State Senate
- Steven G. Nash (1938–1991), Illinois State Senate
- Todd Nash (fl. 2020s), Oregon State Senate
- William Beverly Nash (c. 1822–1888), South Carolina State Senate
- William F. Nash (1847–1916), Wisconsin State Senate
