= Thomas Nash =

Thomas or Tom Nash may also refer to:

- Thomas Nash (relative of Shakespeare) (1593–1647), a relative of William Shakespeare's
- Thomas Nash (RAF officer) (1891–1918), World War I flying ace
- Thomas Nash (Newfoundland) (1730–1810), fisherman and settler in Newfoundland
- Tom Nash (American football) (1905–1972), American football player
- Tom Nash, professional wrestler and first husband of Luna Vachon
- Tom Nash (Home and Away), a character from an Australian soap opera
- Thomas Nash, a character from the ABC television show Agents of S.H.I.E.L.D.
- Thomas Hawkes Nash III (1945–), American lichenologist

== See also ==
- Thomas Nashe (1567–c. 1601), Elizabethan playwright and pamphleteer
- Thomas Nast (1840–1902), cartoonist
