= Edith Coleridge =

British author

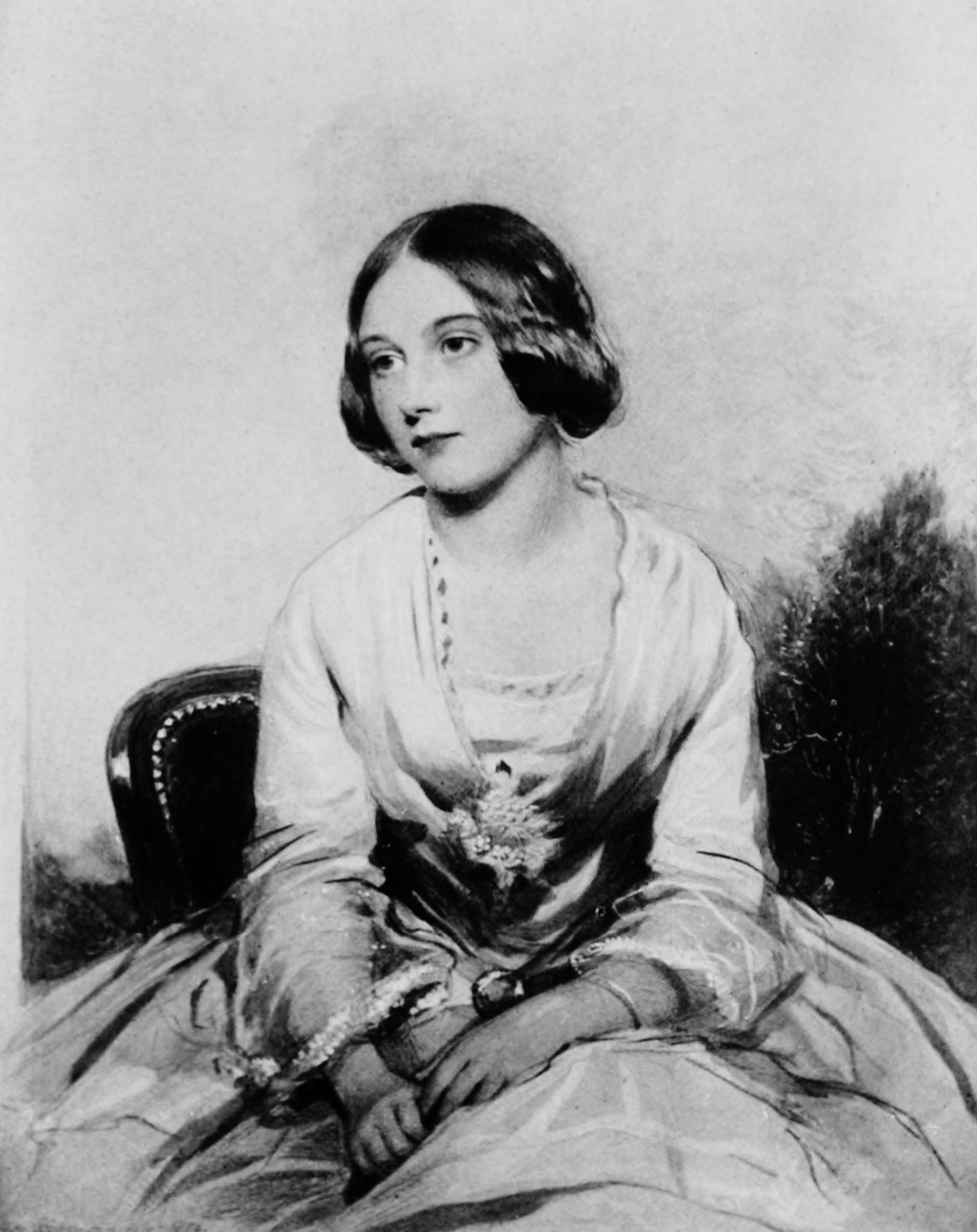
- Edith Coleridge, from A Poet's Children, Hartley and Sara Coleridge (1912)
- Born: 1832
- Died: 24 January 1911 (aged 78–79)
- Parents: Henry Nelson Coleridge; Sara Coleridge
- Relatives: Herbert Coleridge (brother); Samuel Taylor Coleridge (maternal grandfather)

Edith Coleridge (1832 – 24 January 1911) was a British author. She edited The Memoir and Letters of Sara Coleridge (1873), a popular biography of her mother. An archive of her collected works is held at the Henry Ransom Center at the University of Texas at Austin.

== Biography ==
Edith Coleridge was the daughter of writer Sara Coleridge, who in turn was the daughter of poet Samuel Taylor Coleridge. Sara Coleridge married her cousin Henry Nelson Coleridge, who was Samuel Taylor Coleridge's literary executor. Edith had a brother, Herbert Coleridge.
