= Herbert Coleridge =

English philologist (1830–1861)

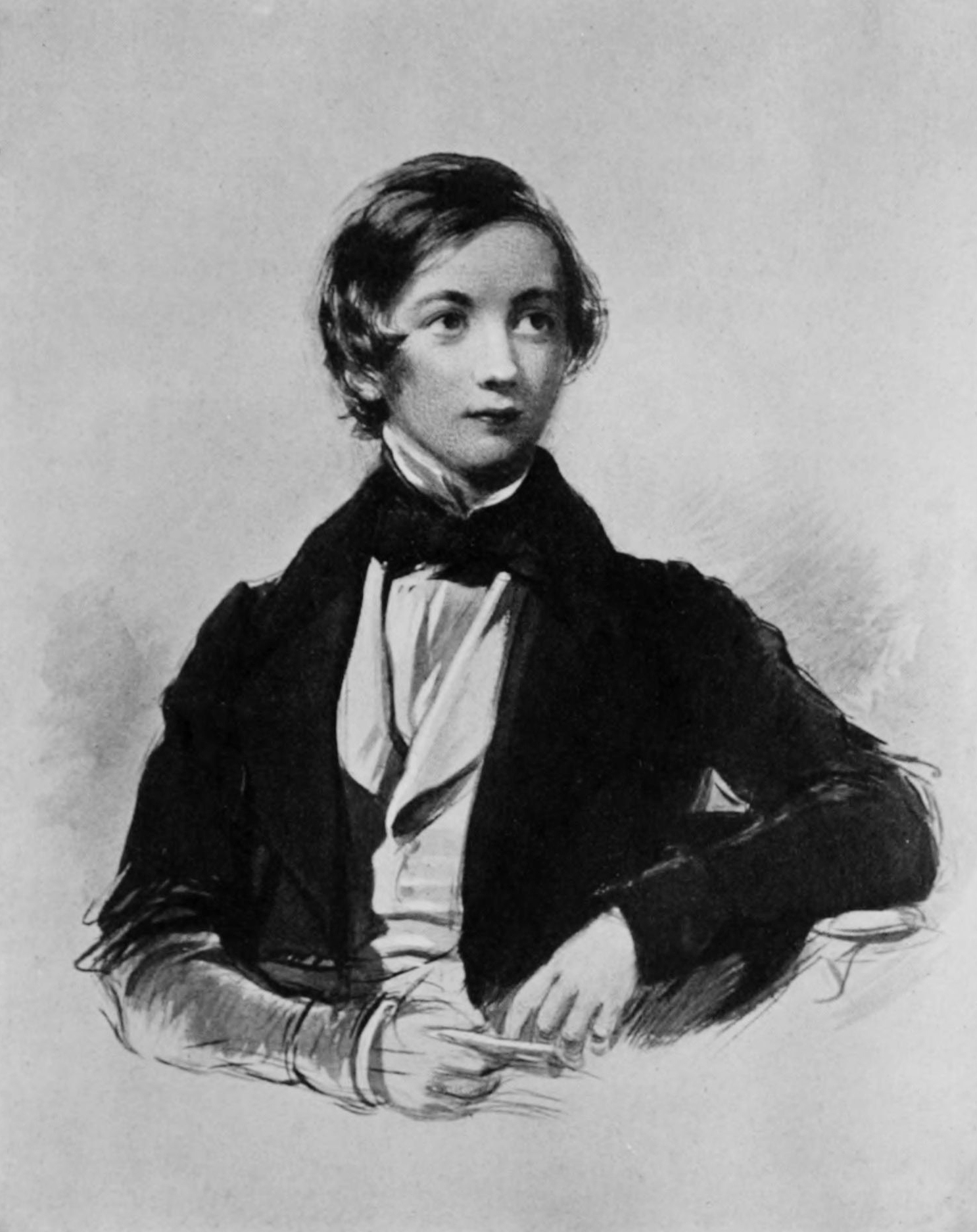
- Coleridge at the age of 17
- Born: 7 October 1830
- Died: 23 April 1861 (aged 30)
- Parents: Henry Nelson Coleridge; Sara Coleridge
- Relatives: Edith Coleridge (sister); Samuel Taylor Coleridge (maternal grandfather)

Herbert "Herbie" Coleridge (7 October 1830 – 23 April 1861) was an English philologist, technically the first editor of what ultimately became the Oxford English Dictionary. He was a grandson of the poet Samuel Taylor Coleridge.

== Biography ==
He was the son of Sara and Henry Nelson Coleridge. He earned a double first in Classics and Mathematics at Balliol College, Oxford. After graduation, he became a barrister, but, living off a small annuity, devoted most of his time and energy to linguistic studies. At age 27, as a member of the Philological Society, he formed a committee with Richard Chenevix Trench and Frederick Furnivall to identify and research words unlisted and undefined in English dictionaries of the period. The efforts of this committee eventually led to the development of the Oxford English Dictionary. A dedicated editor, he died of tuberculosis at age 30 after completing some fundamental work for the project.

He died on 23 April 1861 at Chester Place, Regents Park and is buried, with his parents and grandparents, in the crypt of St Michael's, Highgate. The coffins were moved in 1961 from the Highgate School Chapel.

== Works ==
- A Glossarial Index to the Printed English Literature of the Thirteenth Century. London: Trubner & Co., 1859.
- A Dictionary of the First, or Oldest Words in the English Language: from the Semi Saxon Period of A.D. 1250 to 1300. Consisting of An Alphabetical Inventory of Every Word Found in the Printed English Literature of the 13TH Century. London: John Camden Hotten, 1863.
