= Frisbie Pie Company =

American pie company

- Industry: Food (bakery)
- Predecessor: Olds Baking Company
- Founded: 1871; 155 years ago
- Headquarters: Bridgeport, Connecticut, United States
- Key people: Dan O’Connor, past owner William Russell Frisbie, the founder
- Products: Dessert pies
- Footnotes; Defunct from 1958 until 2016, then later at 2022 until now.

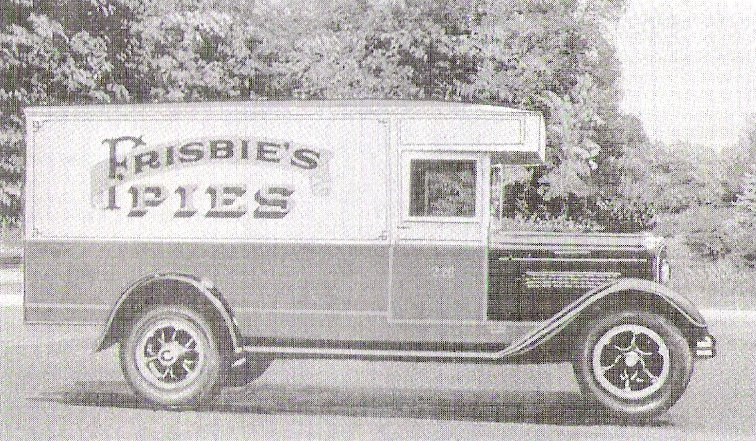
1920s Frisbie's pie delivery truck

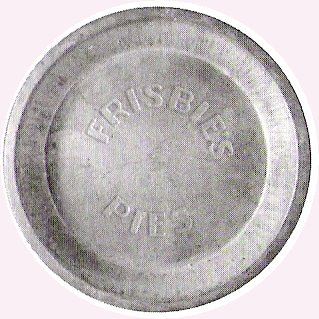
Frisbie pie tin

The Frisbie Pie Company is an American pie company located in Bridgeport, Connecticut. It was founded in 1871 by William Russell Frisbie in Bridgeport, Connecticut, when he bought and renamed a branch of the Olds Baking Company. The company was located on Kossuth Street in Bridgeport's East Side, where workers would toss around the pie tins while on their breaks. The activity made its way to nearby college campuses.

== Pie tins ==
Frisbie supplied pies to many Connecticut retailers and restaurants, including the Middlebury College campus in nearby Vermont. Middlebury students discovered that the pie tins, inverted, had an airfoil shape, which enabled them to be thrown, with practice, in various trajectories.

In 1957, the Wham-O toy company, had the rights to a plastic flying disc design, called the "Pluto Platter". To capitalize on the craze over the pie tins, known colloquially as "Frisbies", they took the same name for their toy, changing the spelling to "Frisbee" to avoid trademark infringement.

== Frisbie pies today ==
The Bridgeport pie factory closed in 1958; Frisbie brand pies were bought out by Table Talk Pies.

In 2016, Dan O’Connor, a Fairfield, Connecticut resident, Frisbee player, collector and historian, acquired the license and distribution rights to the Frisbie Pie Co. He re-launched the company in November 2016 in Bridgeport, Connecticut and began distributing pies throughout the region in early 2017. They make pies based on the original Frisbie Pie Company recipe.

Since 2022, their website, www.frisbiepie.com, has been defunct. The reason is unknown, but it is possibly due to the COVID-19 pandemic.

== In popular culture ==
In Back to the Future Part III, Marty McFly (Michael J. Fox) while time-travelling to the Wild West, finds amusement in seeing the word "Frisbie" at the bottom of a pie plate. He later throws the plate at a derringer held by outlaw Buford "Mad Dog" Tannen (Thomas F. Wilson), foiling his attempt to shoot Doctor Emmett Brown (Christopher Lloyd).

== See also ==
- Flying disc games
