= St John the Evangelist, Penge =

St John the Evangelist's Church
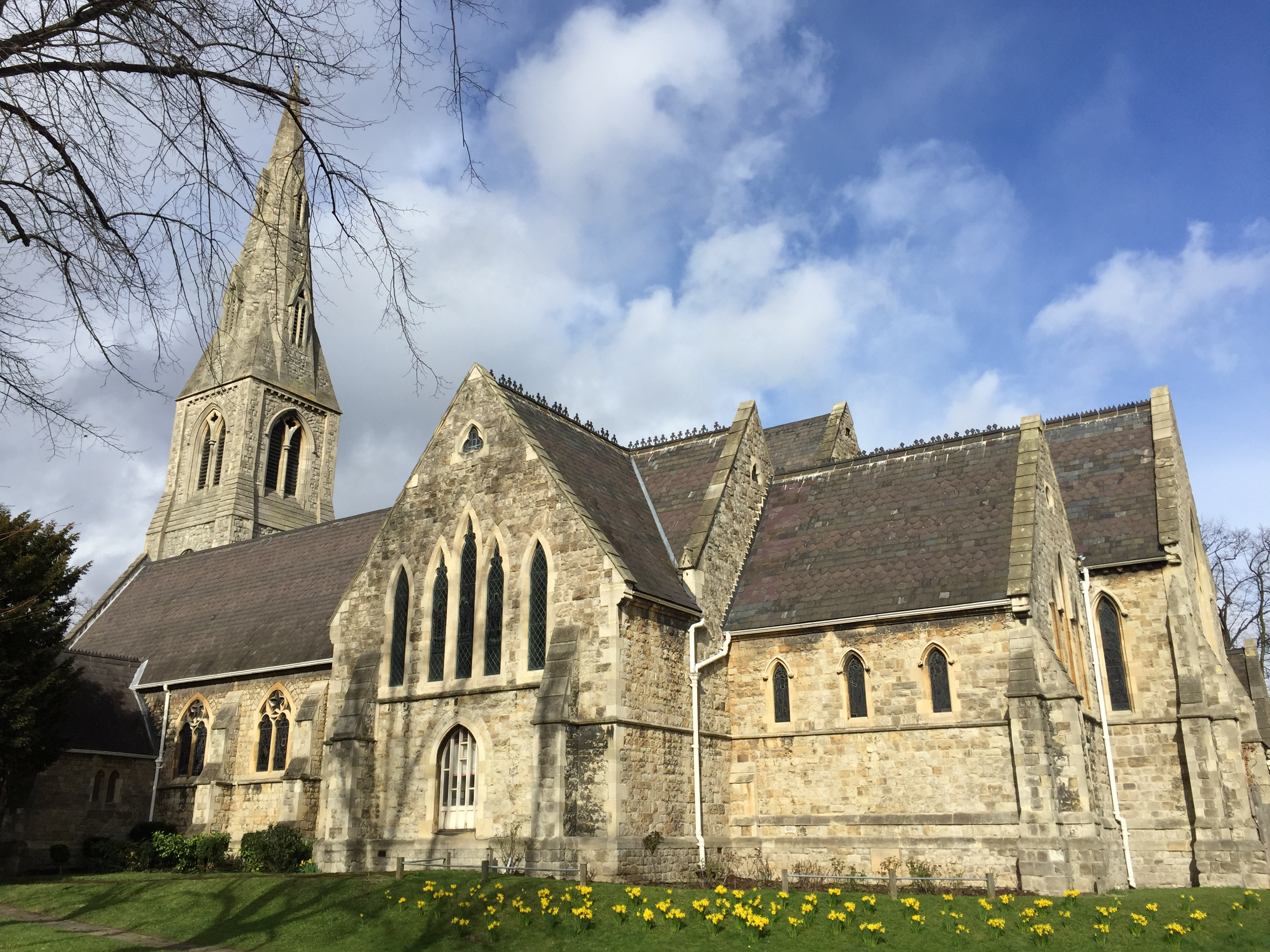
- St John the Evangelist's Church
- 51.4167°N 0.0550°W
- OS grid reference: TQ 35351 70417
- Location: 2 St John's Road, Penge, London SE20 7EQ
- Country: England
- Denomination: Church of England
- Churchmanship: Conservative evangelical
- Website: www.penge-anglicans.org

Architecture
- Architect(s): Edwin Nash, J. N. Round
- Style: Victorian architecture, Gothic Revival architecture
- Years built: 1850-1866

Administration
- Diocese: Rochester
- Archdeaconry: Bromley and Bexley
- Deanery: Penge
- Parish: Penge

Listed Building – Grade II
- Designated: 15 January 1990
- Reference no.: 1186832

Saint John the Evangelist is the Church of England parish church of Penge (now in the London Borough of Bromley), in the Diocese of Rochester in Greater London. At the time of its erection, Penge was in Surrey and had been an exclave of Battersea. It is located on Penge High Street, and was erected in 1847 to the designs of architects Edwin Nash & J. N. Round. Later in 1861, Nash alone added the gabled aisles, and in 1866 the transepts. The Pevsner Buildings of England series guides describe it as "Rock-faced ragstone. West tower and stone broach spire. Geometrical tracery, treated in Nash's quirky way. The best thing inside is the open timber roofs, those in the transepts especially evocative, eight beams from all four directions meeting in mid air. It has been Grade II listed since 1990.

The early funding of the church came from John Dudin Brown who was a Thames wharfinger. The organist and choir master from 1872 to 1903 was the composer Arthur Carnall (1852–1904).

== See also ==
- Penge Congregational Church
