= Ted Nash =

Ted Nash may refer to:

- Ted Nash (entrepreneur) (born 1991), British businessman
- Ted Nash (saxophonist, born 1922) (1922–2011), American jazz musician
- Ted Nash (saxophonist, born 1960), American jazz saxophonist, flutist and composer
- Ted Nash (rower) (1932–2021), American rower

== See also ==
- Edward Nash (disambiguation)
