= Adam Nash =

Adam Nash may refer to:

- Adam Nash (savior sibling) (born 2000)
- Adam Nash (executive) (fl. 1990s–2020s)
- Adam Nash, character in The Country of Marriage
