= James Coleridge =

- Born: 3 December 1759; Ottery St Mary, England
- Died: 1836 (aged 76–77)
- Known for: The Colonel

James Coleridge (3 December 1759 – 10 January 1836) was an older brother of the philosopher-poet Samuel Taylor Coleridge.

== History ==
James was the third son of the Reverend John Coleridge, the well-respected vicar of St Mary's Church, Ottery St Mary and was headmaster of the King's School, a free grammar school established by King Henry VIII in the town. He had previously been master of Hugh Squier's School in South Molton, Devon, and lecturer of nearby Molland.

James obtained his captaincy during the period of the French Revolutionary Wars and was later promoted to Colonel. He purchased the Coleridge family home, the Chanter's House, in Ottery St. Mary, Devon in 1796. During the Napoleonic Wars he escorted French prisoners to Dartmoor prison.

== Family ==
On 27 February 1788 he married Frances Duke Taylor at St Mary Arches Church, Exeter. They had six surviving children, including Sir John Taylor Coleridge, future Judge of the King's Bench, and Henry Nelson Coleridge, the editor of Samuel Taylor Coleridge's works.

He died on 10 January 1836 aged 76.
