= Edward Nash (painter) =

English painter (1778–1821)

- Born: 1778
- Died: 1821 (aged 42–43)
- Education: Pupil of Samuel Shelley
- Known for: Miniature painting

Edward Nash (1778–1821) was an English painter, best known for his miniatures.

== Life ==
Edward Nash was born in 1778. He became a pupil of Samuel Shelley, and trained as a miniaturist. He visited the Netherlands with Robert Southey and his family in 1815. Nash painted a miniature of the famous poet, and a double portrait miniature of Edith May Southey and Sara Coleridge, in 1820. In later life, he also spent several years in India. He exhibited at the Royal Academy of Arts in London from 1811 to 1820. He died in 1821, in London.

== Gallery ==
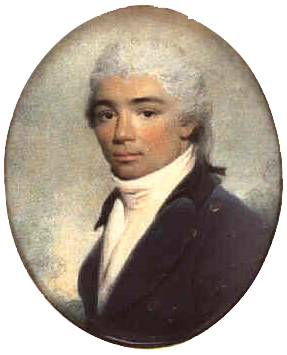
Gentleman in dark blue coat (c. 1800)

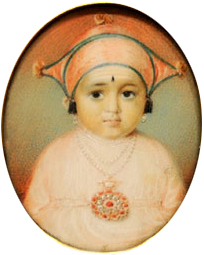
Baby Rajah, son of Lingah Rajah (c. 1805)

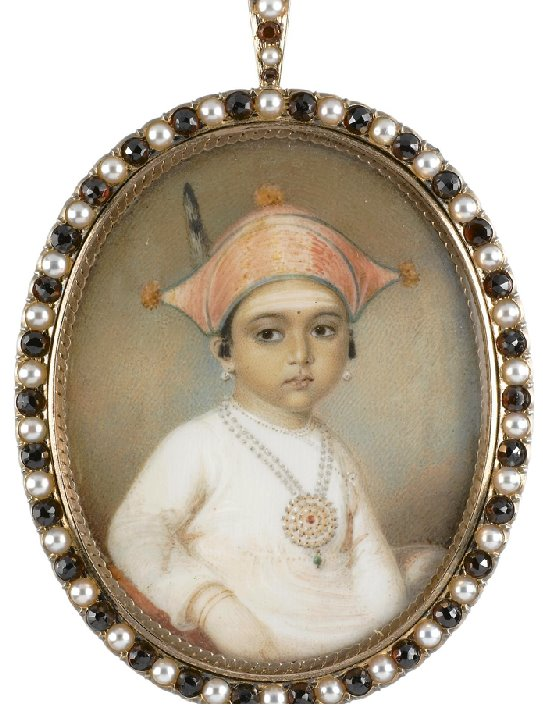
Mooda Maji of Coorg (1807)

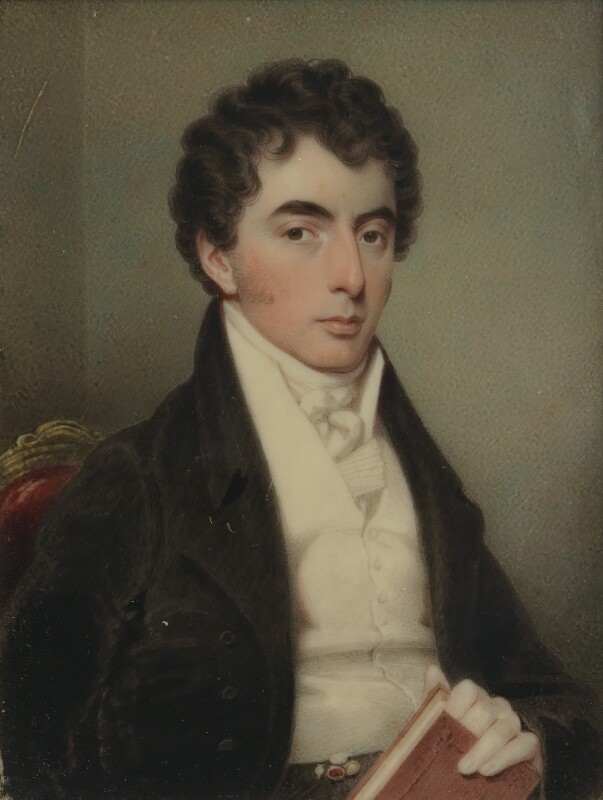
Robert Southey (1820)

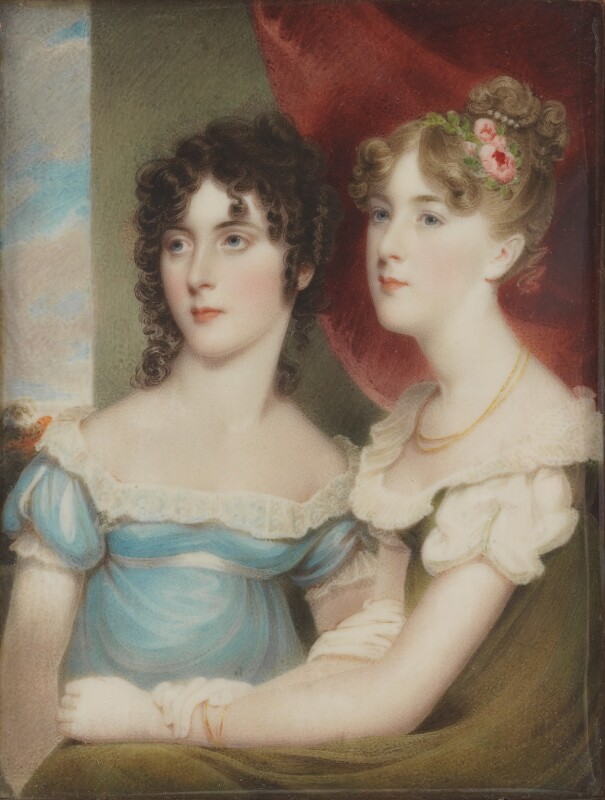
Sara Coleridge; Edith May Warter (1820)

== Sources ==
- Beyer, Andreas; Savoy, Bénédicte; Tegethoff, Wolf, eds. (2021). "Nash, Edward (1778)". Allgemeines Künstlerlexikon – International Artist Database – Online. Berlin, New York: K.G. Saur. Retrieved 15 September 2022 – via De Gruyter.
- Oliver, Valerie Cassel, ed. (2011). "Naish, Edward". Benezit Dictionary of Artists. Oxford University Press. Retrieved 15 September 2022 – via Oxford Art Online.
- Youngquist, Paul; Wang, Orrin N. C., eds. (2019). "Nash, Edward (1778–1821)". Romantic Circles. University of Colorado Boulder. Retrieved 15 September 2022.
