= James Nash (ecotheologian) =

James A. Nash (1938–2008) was one of the first Christian ecotheologians. In his book, Loving Nature: Ecological Integrity and Christian Responsibility Nash objected to the traditional Western religious approach to nature based on dominion and control, attempting to replace this by the view of Man as a member of the community of nature.

Nash received a PhD in Social Ethics from Boston University in 1967. He served many for years as a journal editor, and was actively involved in the Society of Christian Ethics until his death. He also contributed significantly as an associate editor for The Encyclopedia of Religion and Nature. He labored for decades in important educational and political positions within the United Methodist Church, seeking to place environmental protection squarely on the Christian agenda.

Nash died on November 5, 2008.
