= Jim Nash (footballer) =

Australian rules footballer, born 1914

Personal information
- Full name: Harold James Nash
- Born: 14 May 1914; Ellerslie, Victoria
- Died: 7 March 1984 (aged 69); Geelong West, Victoria
- Original team: Ellerslie
- Height: 170 cm (5 ft 7 in)
- Weight: 80 kg (176 lb)

Playing career^{1}
Years	Club	Games (Goals)
1935–36, 1939–40	Geelong	44 (6)
- ^{1} Playing statistics correct to the end of 1940.

Harold James Nash (14 May 1914 – 7 March 1984) was an Australian rules footballer who played with Geelong in the Victorian Football League (VFL).
