= Sara Coleridge =

English author (1802–1852)

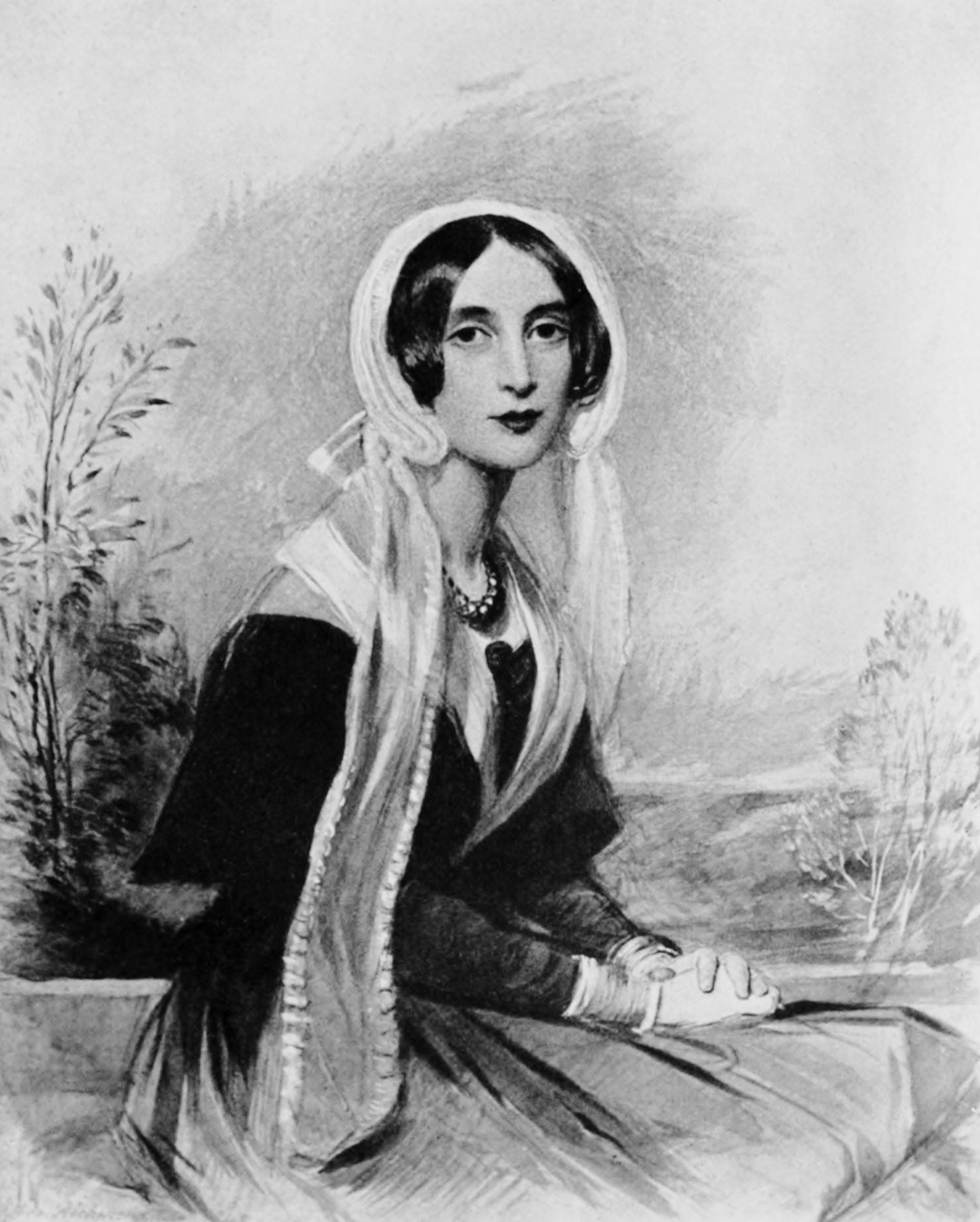
- Born: 23 December 1802; Keswick, Cumberland, England
- Died: 3 May 1852 (aged 49); London, England
- Occupation: Translator
- Spouse: Henry Nelson Coleridge
- Children: 5, including Herbert Coleridge and Edith Coleridge
- Parent(s): Samuel Taylor Coleridge; Sara Fricker
- Relatives: Hartley Coleridge (brother); Derwent Coleridge (brother)
- Writing career
- Notable works: The Months; Phantasmion

Sara Coleridge (23 December 1802 – 3 May 1852) was an English writer and translator. She was the third child and only daughter of the poet Samuel Taylor Coleridge and his wife Sara Fricker.

Her first works were translations from Latin and medieval French. She then married and had several children for whom she wrote instructive verses. These were published as Pretty Lessons in Verse for Good Children in 1834 which included popular poems like The Months: "January brings the snow, makes our feet and fingers glow." In 1837, she published her longest original work – Phantasmion, A Fairy Tale – which also started as a story for her son Herbert.

== Early life ==
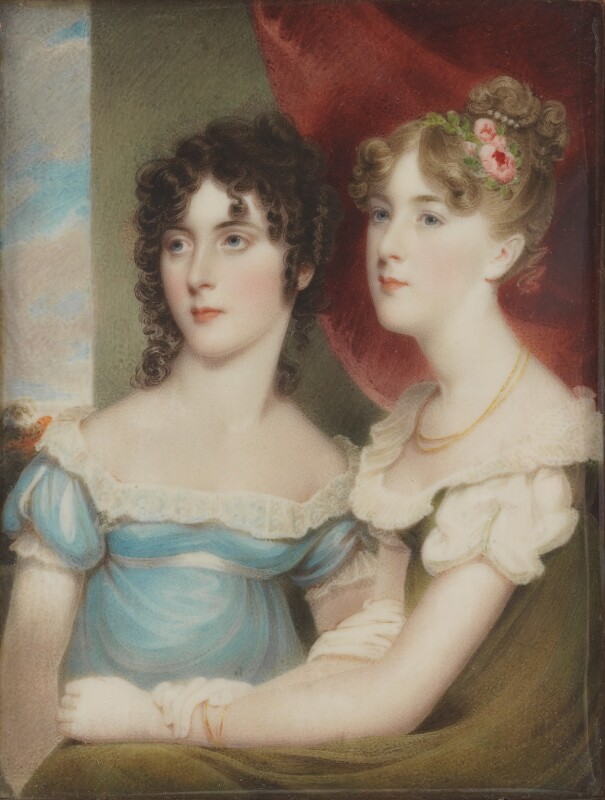
Edward Nash: Sara Coleridge and Edith May Warter (1820)

Coleridge was born at Greta Hall, Keswick. Here, after 1803, the Coleridges, Robert Southey and his wife (Mrs. Coleridge's sister), and Mrs. Lovell (another sister), widow of Robert Lovell, the Quaker poet, all lived together; but Coleridge was often away from home; and Uncle Southey was a paterfamilias. The Wordsworths at Grasmere were their neighbours.

Wordsworth, in his poem, "The Triad", has left us a description, or poetical glorification, as Sara Coleridge calls it, of the three girls: his own daughter Dora, Edith Southey and Sara Coleridge, the last of the three, though eldest born. Greta Hall was Sara Coleridge's home until her marriage; and the little Lake colony seems to have been her only school. Guided by Southey, and with his ample library at her command, she read by herself the chief Greek and Latin classics, and before she was twenty-five had learnt in addition French, German, Italian and Spanish.

== Career ==
In 1822, Sara Coleridge published Account of the Abipones, a translation in three large volumes of Martin Dobrizhoffer, undertaken in connection with Southey's Tale of Paraguay, which had been suggested to him by Dobrizhoffer's volumes; and Southey alludes to his niece, the translator (canto, iii, stanza 16), where he speaks of the pleasure the old missionary would have felt if

he could in Merlin's glass have seen
By whom his tomes to speak our tongue were taught.

In less grandiloquent terms, Charles Lamb, writing about the Tale of Paraguay to Southey in 1825, says, "How she Dobrizhoffered it all out, puzzles my slender Latinity to conjecture." In 1825, her second work appeared, a translation from the medieval French of the Loyal Serviteur, The Right Joyous and Pleasant History of the Feats, Jests, and Prowesses of the Chevalier Bayard, the Good Knight without Fear and without Reproach: By the Loyal Servant.

In September 1829, at Crosthwaite Parish Church, Keswick, after an engagement of seven years duration, Sara Coleridge was married to her cousin, Henry Nelson Coleridge (1798–1843), younger son of Captain James Coleridge. He was then a chancery barrister in London.

The first eight years of her married life were spent in a little cottage in Hampstead. There four of her children were born, of whom two survived. In 1834, Mrs Coleridge published her Pretty Lessons in Verse for Good Children; with some Lessons in Latin in Easy Rhyme. These were originally written for the instruction of her own children, and became very popular.

In 1837, the Coleridges moved to Chester Place, Regent's Park; and in the same year appeared Phantasmion, a Fairy Tale, Sara Coleridge's longest original work, described by critic Mike Ashley as "the first fairytale novel written in English".

The literary historian Dennis Butts describes Phantasmion as a "remarkable pioneering fantasy" and "an extraordinary monument to her talent". The songs in Phantasmion were much admired in their time by Leigh Hunt and other critics. Some, such as "Sylvan Stag" and "One Face Alone", are notably graceful and musical and the whole fairy tale has beauty of story and richness of language. Some scholars of the fantasy genre call Phantasmion a possible influence on George MacDonald.

== Later life ==
In 1843, Henry Coleridge died, leaving to his widow the unfinished task of editing her father's works. To these she added some compositions of her own, among which are the essay "On Rationalism, with a special application to the Doctrine of Baptismal Regeneration" appended to Coleridge's Aids to Reflection, the preface added to Essays on his Own Times, by S. T. Coleridge, and the introduction to Biographia Literaria.

In 1850, Coleridge discovered a lump in her breast. Her physician decided not to operate, prescribing cod liver oil and opium. Knowing there was no cure, she waited for the disease to take its course. "I live in constant fear", Coleridge wrote, "like the Ancient Mariner with the Albatross hung about his neck, I have a weight always upon me."

Shortly before she died she amused herself by writing a little autobiography for her daughter. This, which reaches only to her ninth year, was completed by her daughter, and published in 1873, together with some of her letters, under the title Memoirs and Letters of Sara Coleridge. The letters show a cultured and highly speculative mind. They contain many apt criticisms of known people and books, and are specially interesting for their allusions to Wordsworth and the Lake Poets. Sara Coleridge died of breast cancer in London on 3 May 1852.

== Family ==
Coleridge suffered a number of miscarriages and only two of her children, Herbert and Edith, survived to adulthood. Two of Coleridge's children died in infancy.

Her son, Herbert Coleridge (1830–1861), won a double first class in classics and mathematics at Oxford in 1852. He was secretary to a committee appointed by the Philological Society to consider the project of a standard English dictionary, a scheme of which the New English Dictionary, published by the Clarendon Press, was the ultimate outcome. His personal researches into the subject were contained in his Glossarial Index to the Printed English Literature of the Thirteenth Century (1859).

Her daughter, Edith Coleridge (1832-1911), edited a biography of Sara, The Memoir and Letters of Sara Coleridge (1873), which helped to preserve her mother's legacy.

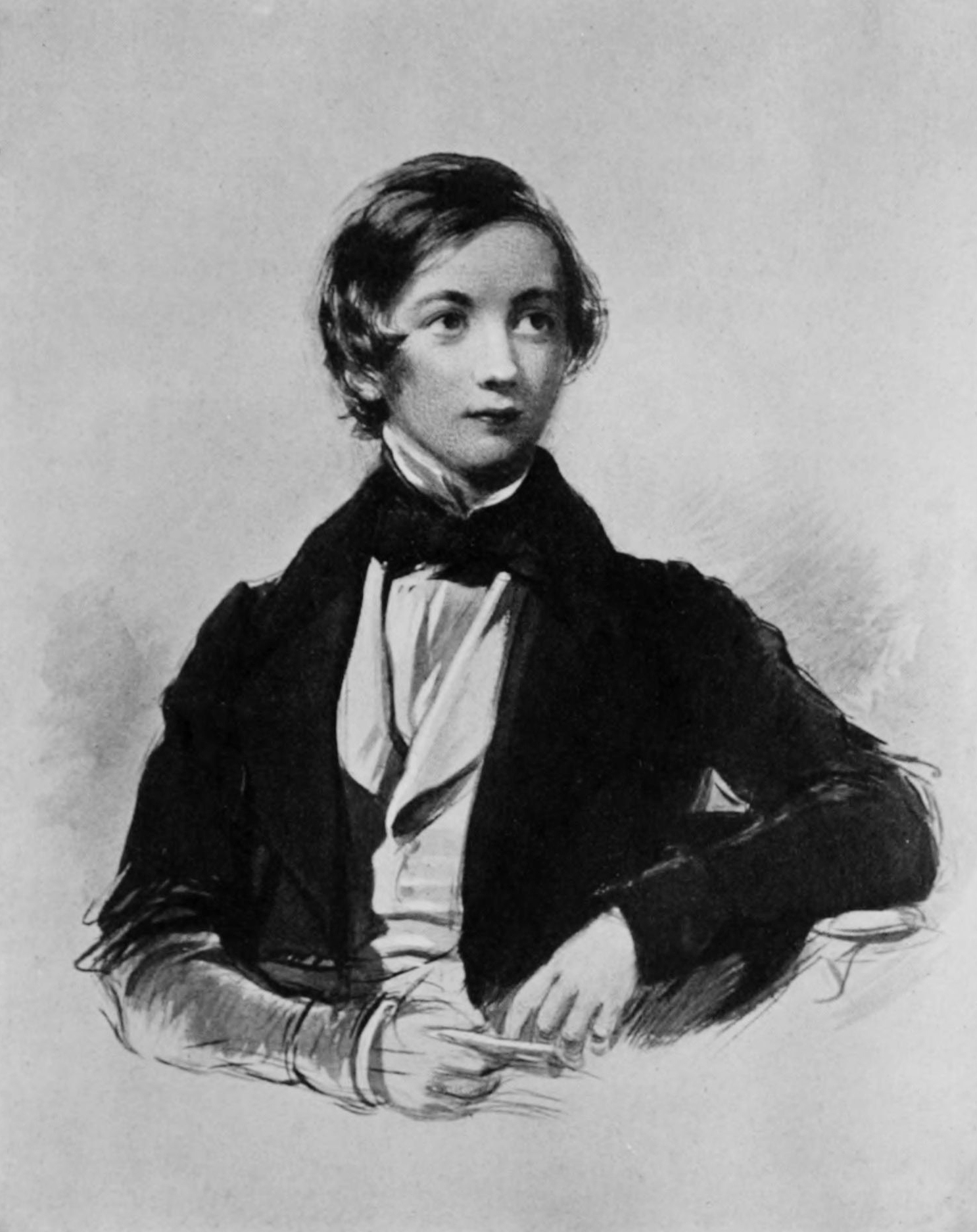
Sara's son Herbert Coleridge

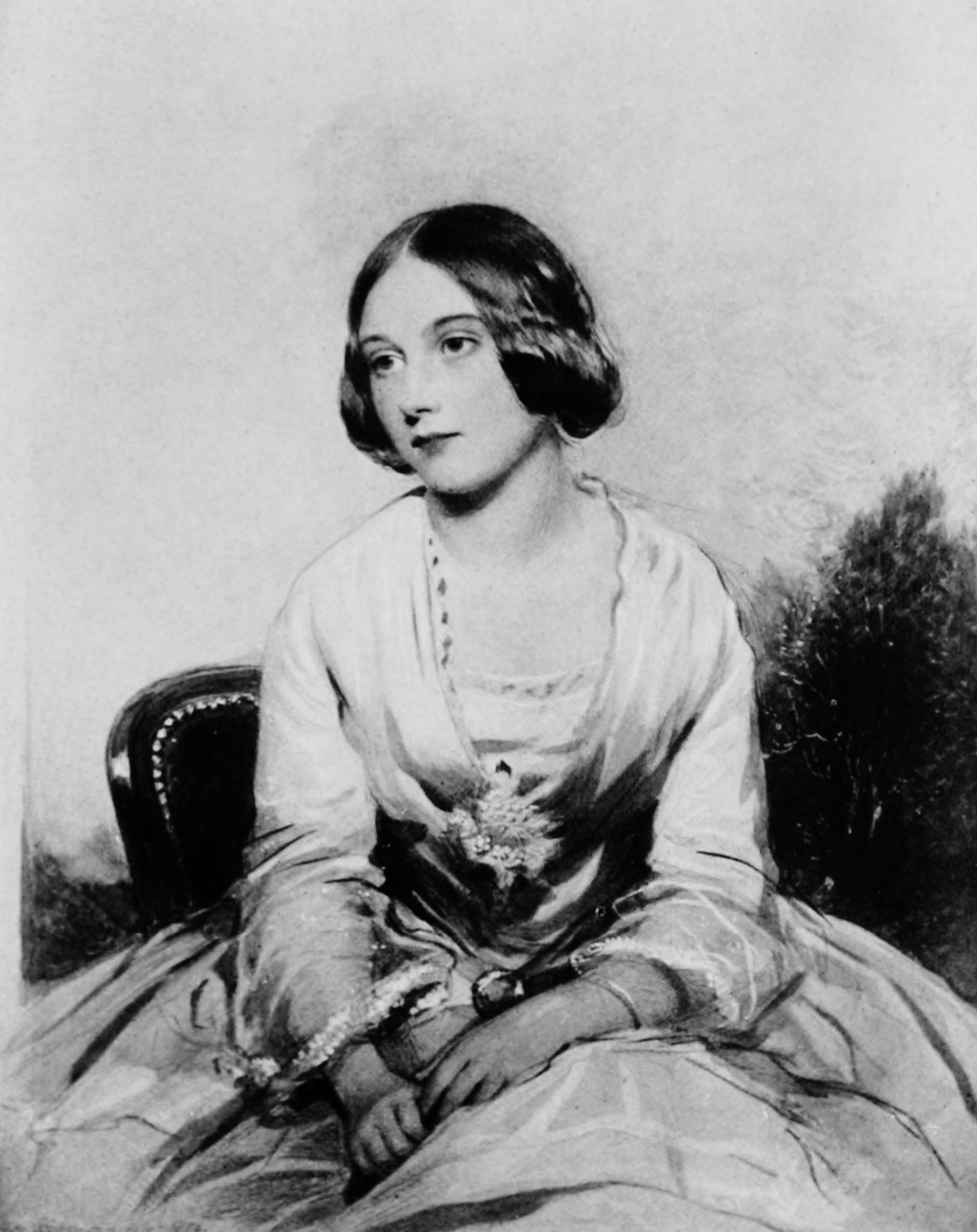
Sara's daughter Edith Coleridge
