= Robert Nash =

Robert Nash may refer to:

- Bob Nash (American football) (1892–1977), American football player
- Bob Nash (basketball) (born 1950), American college basketball coach
- Robert Lucas Nash (1846–1920), Australian financial journalist
- Robert Nash (Australian footballer) (1884–1958), Australian rules footballer
- Robert Nash, North Carolina General Assembly of 1778
- Robert Nash, actor in the 1965 American film Mutiny in Outer Space
- Robert Nash, character in the TV series 9-1-1

== See also ==
- Jay Robert Nash (1937–2024), American author
