= Table Talk Pies =

Founded in 1924, known for its mini pies Walmart partnership and Frisbie link

- Industry: Food processing
- Founded: 1924
- Headquarters: Worcester, Massachusetts, USA
- Products: Table Talk Snack and Dessert pies
- Number of employees: 300
- Subsidiaries: A&V Carriers
- Website: www.tabletalkpie.com

The Table Talk Pie Company is an American company located in Worcester, Massachusetts.

== Products ==
Table Talk Pies is perhaps known best for their 4-inch (10 cm) snack pies, although they also produce 8-inch (20 cm) pies. The company produces 180,000 4-inch (10 cm) pies and 80,000 8-inch (20 cm) pies daily, with flavors that include blueberry, apple, lemon, chocolate eclair, pineapple, cherry, pumpkin, peach, pecan, banana creme, and chocolate creme.

Table Talk Pies is the manufacturer of the Walmart private label, 84-cent Freshness Guaranteed, The Bakery collection pies.

Of the 250 million pies per year manufactured by Table Talk Pies, 185 million pies (74 percent) goes to Walmart.

== History ==
In 1924, the company was founded by Theodore Tonna and Angelo Cotsidas, both Greek immigrants.

In 1958, Table Talk purchased the Frisbie Pie Company, which is credited with providing the inspiration for the frisbee brand name.

In the 1960s, the business was sold to Beech-Nut.

In 1984, Beech-Nut shut down, taking the Table Talk brand with it.

In 1986, Table Talk Pies was reopened by Tonna's son-in-law, Christo Cocaine.

In 2016, the company announced plans to build an additional production plant, as well as open its first retail store in more than 20 years.

On January 25, 2017 (9 years ago), Table Talk Pies opened their store on Canal Street in Worcester.

In August 2020, construction began on a new 120,000-square-foot (11,000 m^{2}) production bakery within the former Crompton & Knowles Looms Works complex.
