= Table talk (literature) =

Literary genre

Table talk is a literary genre, a species of memoir. A collector (biographer, colleague, friend, etc.) records impromptu comments by some famous person (made generally at the dining table or in small get-togethers), in anticipation of their lasting value. The precedent in classical literature was the account of a symposium, such as the Table Talk (Symposiaka) of Plutarch, though this was a supposed memoir of an occasion, rather than a person. This classical genre itself derives from the more philosophical dialogues written by the followers of Socrates, and in particular the Symposia of Plato and Xenophon.

"Table talk" may also refer to a similar informal conversation, more deliberately engaged in by the famous person, with the direct intent of publication (somewhat analogous to granting an interview).

== Collections ==
Collections of such table talks by royal persons, celebrities, and other important personalities dating back to the 3rd century exist. The phrase table talk has been in use in the English language since the 16th century.

As examples, published table talks exist for:

- Martin Luther (1483–1546), see Table Talk;
- John Selden (1584–1654);
- John Milton (1608–1674);
- Samuel Johnson (1707–1784);
- Frederick the Great (1712–1786);
- Johann von Goethe (1749–1832), see Gespräche mit Goethe;
- Napoleon Bonaparte (1769–1821);
- Ludwig van Beethoven (1770–1827), see German: Konversationshefte;
- Samuel Taylor Coleridge (1772–1834); see Specimens of the Table Talk of the Late Samuel Taylor Coleridge
- Amos Bronson Alcott (1799–1888);
- Alexander Pushkin (1799–1837), see Table-talk
- George Bernard Shaw (1856–1950);
- Adolf Hitler (1889–1945), see "Hitler's Table Talk";
- Wystan Hugh Auden (1907–1973);
- Orson Welles (1915–1985).

Occasionally, comments are collected from others by a notable person as part of that person's working notes and may survive in the papers of that person. Ralph Waldo Emerson, for example, kept notes on the conversations of his family and friends, many of whom, of course, were noteworthy.
