= Justice Nash =

Justice Nash may refer to:

- George K. Nash (1842–1904), member of the Supreme Court Commission of Ohio
- Frederick Nash (1781–1858), chief justice of the North Carolina Supreme Court
