= Nahash =

The word nahash means "serpent" in Hebrew. Nahash may refer to

- Serpents in the Bible
- Nahash of Ammon, a king mentioned in the first Book of Samuel.
- Another king of the Ammonites of the same name who showed kindness to David during his wanderings (2 Samuel 10:2) is also mentioned. On his death, David sent an embassy of sympathy to Hanun, Nahash's son and successor.
- The father of Abigail, mother of Amasa, according to 2 Samuel 17:25.

== See also ==
- Nahshon
