= General Nash =

General Nash may refer to:

- Francis Nash (c. 1742–1777), Continental Army brigadier general in the American Revolutionary War
- Richard C. Nash (born 1950), U.S. Army National Guard brevet lieutenant general
- William L. Nash (fl. 1990s–2000s), U.S. Army major general
