= Richard Nash =

Richard Nash may refer to:

- Richard Nash (MP for Worcester) (died 1605), Member of Parliament (MP) for Worcester
- Richard Nash (MP died 1395), MP for Herefordshire and Hereford
- Richard Nash (Australian politician) (1890–1951), Australian Senator
- Richard C. Nash (born 1950), U.S. Army general
- Beau Nash (1674–1761), born Richard Nash, English dandy
- N. Richard Nash (1913–2000), writer and dramatist
- Dick Nash (born 1928), American jazz trombonist
- Rick Nash (born 1984), Canadian hockey player
- Rick Nash (comics), a character from Cerebus the Aardvark comics
