= James Nash (musician) =

American guitarist and singer (born 1973)

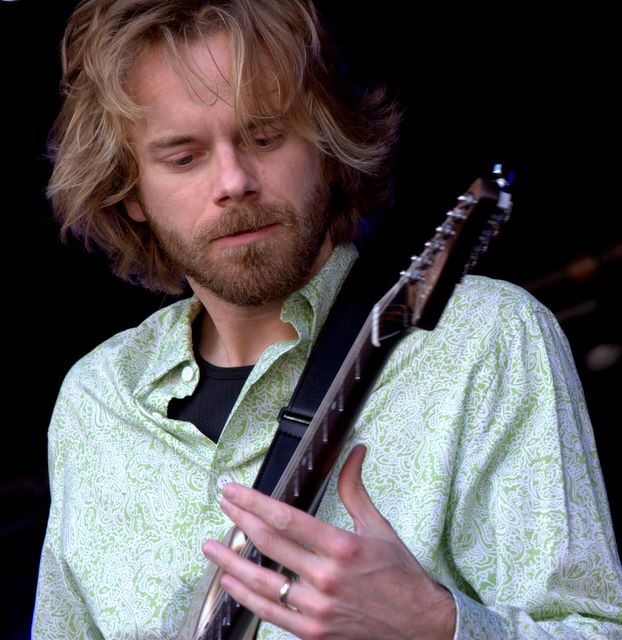

Background information
- Born: James Nash; June 14, 1973 (age 53); Durham, NC, U.S.
- Origin: San Francisco Bay Area
- Genres: Americana, rock, bluegrass
- Occupations: Musician, singer-songwriter
- Instruments: Guitar, mandolin, singing
- Years active: 1992–present
- Label: Compass
- Website: www.jamesnash.com

James Nash (born June 14, 1973) is an American guitarist and singer best known for his work with the band the Waybacks.

== Career ==
Nash has performed with self-described "acoustic mayhem" quartet the Waybacks since 1999, performing at venues such as the Kennedy Center, Ryman Auditorium, Old Town School of Music, the Warfield, the Fillmore, and the Bumbershoot and Wakarusa festivals. He has performed with the Philadelphia Orchestra at the Mann Center, with the Chattanooga Symphony, and with artists such as Bob Weir, Joan Osborne, Sam Bush, Rodney Crowell, and Jens Kruger. In 2017, Nash was named one of the 50 best acoustic guitarists of all time by Guitar Player.

He is an Artist Ambassador for the Santa Cruz Guitar Company.

=== Style ===
Nash blends bluegrass, swing, country, jazz, and experimental rock influences, and is known for adapting solid body electric guitar techniques to the traditional steel-string acoustic guitar. In 2011, he released an instructional DVD Making the Acoustic Guitar Rock! on Homespun. In 2017, Nash was chosen alongside Chet Atkins, Django Reinhardt, and Michael Hedges as "50 transcendent superheroes of wood, steel, and nylon" by Guitar Player magazine.

=== Hillside Album Hour ===
In 2008, Nash began producing and directing the "Hillside Album Hour" at Merlefest in North Carolina. Featured performers have included Elvis Costello, Emmylou Harris, Gillian Welch, Susan Tedeschi, and Joan Osborne. In 2017, Rolling Stone magazine dubbed the event "one of the most anticipated performances of the festival," and described the band's adaptation of "Sgt. Pepper's Lonely Hearts Club Band" as "an inventive tribute studded with sounds that spanned the psychedelic era". As of 2024, the event has taken place for 16 consecutive years.

== Discography ==
Nash’s recording credits include acoustic and electric guitar, bottleneck guitar, mandolin, bass, vocals, songwriter, arranger, engineer, and producer.

=== With The Waybacks ===
- Devolver (2000)
- Burger After Church (2002)
- Way Live (2003)
- From the Pasture to the Future (Compass, 2006)
- Loaded (Compass, 2008)
- Hillside Album Hour 2008: Led Zeppelin II (2009)
- Merlefest Watson Stage w/Special Guests (2009)
- Hillside Album Hour 2010: Abbey Road (2011)
- Hillside Album Hour 2011: Eat A Peach (2012)

=== As producer ===
- The Waybacks, Secret Stage Mixes Vol. 1 - 3 (2009)
- The Waybacks, Hendrix on the Hillside (2013)
- The Waybacks, After The Flood (2014)
- The Waybacks, Deja View (2015)
- The Waybacks, Back in the USA (2016)
- The Waybacks, Birdsongs (2017)
- The Waybacks, With A Lotta Help From Our Friends (2018)
- The Waybacks, Full On The Hill (2019)
- Mokai, The Jaybird Said (2019)
- The Waybacks, Stairway To Hillside (2020)
- The Waybacks, Halfway To Heaven (2022)
- The Waybacks, One Way Or Another (2023)
- The Waybacks, Getting In Tune (2024)
- The Waybacks, You Can Lean On Me (2025)

=== With others ===
- Occams Razor, Occams Razor (1992)
- Occams Razor, Mister Moon (1995)
- JT & the Clouds, Delilah (2002)
- Corinne West, Bound For The Living (2004)
- Patty and Abigail, Here We Go Again (2005)
- Various, Songs for Sophie: A Collings Collective (2005)
- Corinne West, The Promise (2009)
- The Cowlicks, Hey, Hey We're The Cowlicks (2009)
- Jesse Brewster, Wrecking Ball at the Concert Hall (2010)
- Toby, Sleeptalk (2010)
- Sherry Austin, Love Still Remains (2010)
- Scott Gagner, Rhapsody In Blonde (2011)
- T Sisters, Ready for Love (2015)
- Spirit Hustler, Spirit Hustler (2022)
- Scott Gagner, Reverse (2023)

== Music technology ==
Nash has a degree in computer science from Stanford University. In 2010, Nash was musical curator for TEDxAlcatraz in San Francisco, including productions with the Grateful Dead’s Bob Weir and cellist Peter Gregson. His TEDx talk “Russell County Gorge” was featured in the 2011 TEDx Global Music Project. In 2012, Nash co-founded the music streaming app Spacebar, which was featured at the 2013 TechCrunch Disrupt in New York. Nash and Spacebar hold multiple US Patents for asynchronous audio and video streaming. Nash is a regular gear review contributor to Guitar Player magazine.

== Personal life ==
Nash is a frequent Little League Baseball and basketball coach. In 2015 he received a Willie Mac Award from the San Francisco Giants for leadership in youth coaching. In 2024 he received the Uncle Abe/Marty Lurie Award from the San Francisco Italian Athletic Club. Nash and his partner Miranda have two sons.
