= Jack Nash =

Jack Nash may refer to:

- Jack Nash (English cricketer) (1873–1956), English cricketer
- Jack Nash (Australian cricketer) (born 1950), Australian cricketer
- Jack Nash (businessman) (1929–2008), American hedge fund pioneer

== See also ==
- John Nash (disambiguation)
