= Henry Nelson Coleridge =

British writer (1798–1843)

- Born: 25 October 1798
- Died: 26 January 1843 (aged 44)
- Spouse: Sara Coleridge (m. 1829)
- Children: 5, including Herbert and Edith
- Parent: Captain James Coleridge (father)
- Relatives: John Taylor Coleridge (brother); Samuel Taylor Coleridge (uncle)

Henry Nelson Coleridge (25 October 1798 – 26 January 1843) was an editor of the works of his uncle Samuel Taylor Coleridge.

== Life ==
His father was Colonel James Coleridge, of Ottery St. Mary. He was born on 25 October 1798. He was educated at Eton and at King's College, Cambridge, of which he became a fellow.

In 1825, he accompanied his uncle, William Hart Coleridge, the bishop of Barbados, to the West Indies, and described his excursion in a bright and lively little book, Six Months in the West Indies in 1825, published anonymously in the following year. He wrote therein volubly on emancipation of slaves, which he enumerated at 800,000, and concluded with this declaration of love and devotion upon his return,

But God bless thee, England, and crown thee with blessings, thou glorious land of my fathers! When I saw the two broad lights on the black Lizard again, my heart swelled with that unconquerable passion which I used to feel on returning from a distant school and sprinting into my dear mother's arms. O my country, I have no pride but that I belong to thee, and can write my name in the muster roll of mankind, an Englishman.

In 1826, he was called to the bar, and in 1829 married his first cousin Sara, daughter of the poet, of whom he wrote three years earlier during their courtship,

Now, reader, if you are an Englishman, (for I know nothing about the Scotch and Irish,) think over your own family, your sisters, or perhaps you have a cousin or so, ---. I love a cousin; she is such an exquisite relation, just standing between me and the stranger to my name, drawing upon so many sources of love and tieing them all up with every cord of human affection - almost my sister ere my wife!

He was the author, as appears from Southey's correspondence, of The Life of Swing, a pamphlet called forth by the rick-burning disturbances of 1830, which went through several editions. In the same year he published an introduction to Homer, the first of a contemplated series on the Greek poets, which was not continued further.

He became Coleridge's literary executor on the death of the latter in 1834, and the short remainder of his life was chiefly devoted to the fulfilment of this trust. Coleridge's Literary Remains, Aids to Reflection, and Confessions of an Inquiring Spirit were edited by him. His most signal service, however, was the preservation of Coleridge's Table Talk, which he had taken down from his lips during a series of years, and of which he published in 1835 'such parts as seem fit for present publication.' How much was withheld we do not know. The work is accompanied by an eloquent preface, vindicating Coleridge's conversation from the charge of obscurity, and his literary character from the charge of plagiarism.

Henry Nelson Coleridge died on 26 January 1843, after long suffering from a spinal complaint. He was lecturer on equity to the Incorporated Law Society, and contributed several articles to the 'Quarterly Review.' He is described as singularly bright and animated when in health, which the general character of his writings tends to confirm. His son Herbert is separately noticed.

== Selected works ==
- The Literary Remains of Samuel Taylor Coleridge (4 volumes): free eBook at Project Gutenberg
- Specimens of the Table Talk of Samuel Taylor Coleridge: free eBook at Project Gutenberg
