= Charles Nash =

Charles Nash may refer to:

- Charles E. Nash (1844–1913), U.S. representative from Louisiana
- Charles Francis Nash (died 1942), airman for the Royal Canadian Air Force in World War II, buried at the Cedar Grove Cemetery (Portsmouth, Virginia)
- Charles W. Nash (1864–1948), United States automobile entrepreneur
- Cotton Nash (Charles Francis Nash 1942–2023), American basketball and baseball player
- Charlie Nash (boxer) (born 1951), Irish Olympic boxer
- Charles W. Nash (politician) (1830–1910), American politician and lawyer in Minnesota
