= John Nash Round =

John Nash Round (1817 – 30 October 1864) was an English Victorian ecclesiastical architect active in the mid-nineteenth-century Kent, England. He worked with architect Edwin Nash) on St. John the Evangelist, Penge (1850); thereafter Edwin Nash worked alone. His name is typically recorded as "J. N. Round."

Round was born in Lambeth, the son of William Nash Round and Jane Pryer Round.

== Works ==
- St. John the Evangelist, Penge (1849–1850, with Edwin Nash). Without Round, Edwin Nash added subsequent work to the church, including the gabled aisles in 1861, and the transepts in 1866.
