= William F. Nash =

American politician

William F. Nash was a member of the Wisconsin State Assembly and the Wisconsin State Senate.

== Biography ==
Nash was born William Francis Nash on February 22, 1847, in Shelby, New York. He moved with his parents to Rock County, Wisconsin, in 1851. During the American Civil War, Nash served with the 13th Wisconsin Volunteer Infantry Regiment of the Union Army. He went on to attend Lawrence University. Nash died on June 26, 1916, in Two Rivers, Wisconsin.

== Political career ==
Nash was a member of the Assembly in 1878 and of the Senate from 1889 to 1894. Additionally, he was Mayor of Two Rivers. He was a Democrat.
