= Edwin Nash =

English Victorian ecclesiastical architect (1812-1884)

Edwin Nash FRIBA (1812 – 14 May 1884) was an English Victorian ecclesiastical architect active in mid-nineteenth-century Kent, England. Most of his commissions were churches. He worked with architect John Nash Round on St. John the Evangelist, Penge (1850). Thereafter he worked alone. He proposed Joseph Fogerty to be a Fellow of the Royal Institute of British Architects.

He married Euphemia of Camberwell and was the father of architect Walter Hilton Nash (1850–1927). He was born in Kennington, Surrey, the son of William Woodbridge Nash and Elizabeth, and baptised 8 January 1813. He died at Lawrie Park, Sydenham, Kent, age 70 or 71.

== Works ==
- St. John the Evangelist, Penge (1850, with J. N. Round). Nash added the gabled aisles in 1861, and the transepts in 1866.
- All Souls' Church, Crockenhill, Kent (1851).
- Restoration (1857) of St. Martin of Tours, Chelsfield, Kent, which "replaced the chancel arch, and rebuilt the northeast annexe as a vestry".
- Rebuilding of St. James's Church, North Cray, Kent, nave (1850–1852), northwest tower (1857), and chancel (1871).
- Restoration (1861–1863) of St. Mary's Church, St. Mary Cray, Kent, which was further restored 1876 and 1895.
- Redesign (1862–1864) of St. Nicholas Church, Sutton.
- St. John's Cottages, Penge, Kent, on Maple Road, built 1863 as almshouses. As with their predecessors, the cottages are now privately owned homes. On New Years Day 1959 No.8 was destroyed by a gas explosion killing one person. The cottage was rebuilt to closely resemble the original.
