= Bill Nash (footballer) =

Australian rules footballer

Personal information
- Full name: William Henry Nash
- Born: 22 June 1882; North Melbourne, Victoria
- Died: 15 June 1962 (aged 79); Brighton, Victoria
- Original team: Balaclava

Playing career^{1}
Years	Club	Games (Goals)
1901	St Kilda	1 (0)
- ^{1} Playing statistics correct to the end of 1901.

William Henry Nash (22 June 1882 – 15 June 1962) was an Australian rules footballer who played with St Kilda in the Victorian Football League (VFL).
