= American Yearbook =

- Directed by: Brian Ging
- Written by: Brian Ging
- Produced by: Brian Ging; Jason F. Brown
- Starring: Nick Tagas; Jon Carlo Alvarez
- Cinematography: Dan Coplan
- Edited by: Brian Ging
- Music by: Jeremiah Jacobs
- Release date: June 15, 2004
- Running time: 97 minutes
- Country: United States
- Language: English
- Budget: $500,000

American Yearbook is a 2004 American drama film written, produced, edited, and directed by Brian Ging. While the film itself is finished, and has been shown at various film festivals. The movie was released in December 2024 on youtube.

== Plot ==
Will Nash (Nick Tagas) is the kid-next-door, a typical upbeat high schooler, but his dreams of being a photographer quickly fade, as he is relentlessly terrorized by school bullies Ian (Chris Peter) and Jason (Ryan Nixon). Will adores Amanda (Giovannie Pico), but her best friend Kristy (Jennifer Noble) is dating the head bully Ian. Confused and angry, Will meets a mysterious, brooding character named Chance (Jon Carlo Alvarez), both of them outsiders. Chance eventually convinces Will that they should get a gun and take the bullies out: pull a Columbine. Amanda pleads with Will to set revenge aside, but can Will stop what he and Chance have started, or are Will's emotions too strong for him to just walk away?

== Cast ==
- Nick Tagas as William "Will" Nash
- Jon Carlo Alvarez as Chance Holden
- Chris Peter aka Shittymorph aka Juicemorph as Ian Blake
- Ryan Nixon as Jason Clarke
- Giovannie Pico as Amanda Hunter
- Jennifer Noble as Kristy Palmer
- Daniel Timko as Brandon Holden

== See also ==
- List of American films of 2004
- Bang Bang You're Dead, a 2002 TV film about a school shooting
- Zero Day, a 2003 film about a school shooting.
- Elephant, another 2003 film about a school shooting.
- Duck! The Carbine High Massacre, a 2000 film about a school shooting.
- The Only Way, another 2004 film about a school shooting.
