= Löwenthal =

Löwenthal, Lowenthal or Loewenthal is a surname of Yiddish and Germanic language origin.

Notable people with this name include:

- Gerhard Löwenthal (1922–2002), German journalist
- Johann Löwenthal (1810–1876), Hungarian chess player
- Leo Löwenthal (1900–1993), German sociologist
- Paul Löwenthal (1936–2022), Belgian economist
- Richard Löwenthal (1908–1991), German journalist
- Xavier Löwenthal (born 1970), Belgian artist, writer and publisher

Loewenthal

- Elena Loewenthal, Italian historian and translator
- Käthe Loewenthal, German Modernist landscape painter
- Naftali Loewenthal, Jewish academic from England
- Wilhelm Loewenthal (1850–1894), French doctor
- Del Loewenthal, British psychotherapist

Lowenthal

- Alan Lowenthal (born 1941), American politician
- Bill Lowenthal (1909–1989), Australian footballer
- Bonnie Lowenthal (born 1940), American politician
- David Lowenthal (1923–2018), American-born British geographer and historian, son of Max, brother of John
- Jerome Lowenthal (born 1932), American classical pianist
- John Lowenthal (1925–2003), American law professor, lifelong defender of Alger Hiss, son of Max, brother of David
- Josh Lowenthal (born 1970), American politician
- Max Lowenthal (1888–1971), American lawyer, longtime associate of Harry S. Truman, father of John and David
- Sally Jessy Raphael (née Lowenthal; born 1935), American TV personality
- Yuri Lowenthal (born 1971), American voice actor

== See also ==
- Löwenthal's method, a method of titration of tannin
- Levental, surname
- Löwendal
