= Bürgi =

Bürgi or Burgi is a German surname derived with the diminutive suffix '-i' and umlaut from the given name Burg, a diminutive of the given names, such as Burghard or Burghold. Notable people with the surname include:

- Chuck Burgi (born 1952), American drummer
- Hans-Beat Bürgi, Swiss crystallographer
- Irene Bürgi, Swiss curler
- Jost Bürgi (1552–1632), Swiss clockmaker, mathematician and maker of astronomical instruments
- Paolo Bürgi (born 1947), Swiss landscape architect
- Richard Burgi (born 1958), American actor

== See also ==
- 2481 Bürgi, an asteroid
- Burg (surname)
- Burji (disambiguation)
