= Burg (surname) =

Burg or Bürg is a German surname. It is a patronymic surname which is a diminutive Burg of the given names, such as Burghard or Burghold. Notable people with the surname include:

== Burg ==
- Avraham Burg (born 1955), Israeli politician, son of Yosef Burg
- Eugen Burg (1871–1944), German film actor
- Gustav von Burg (1871–1927), Swiss naturalist, teacher, and writer
- Hansi Burg (1898–1975), Austrian-born German actress
- JeAnne Burg (1937–2020), American environmental statistician
- Josef Burg (1912–2009), Jewish Soviet writer, author, publisher and journalist
- Mark Burg (born 1959), American film producer and actor
- Meno Burg (1789–1853), Prussian field officer
- Robert Burg (1890–1946), German baritone
- Yosef Burg (1909–1999), Israeli politician, father of Avraham Burg

== Bürg ==
- Johann Tobias Bürg (1766–1835), Austrian astronomer

== See also ==
- Bürgi (surname)
