= Bharbhunja =

Bharbhunja may refer to:

- Bharbhunja (Hindu), an Indian Hindu community
- Bharbhunja (Muslim), an Indian Muslim community

== See also ==
- Bhurji (disambiguation)
