= Clara Arnheim =

German painter

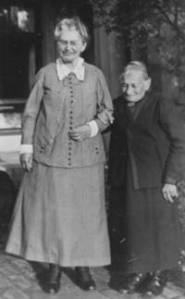
Clara Arnheim (left) with her stepsister Betty Volkmar (c.1930).

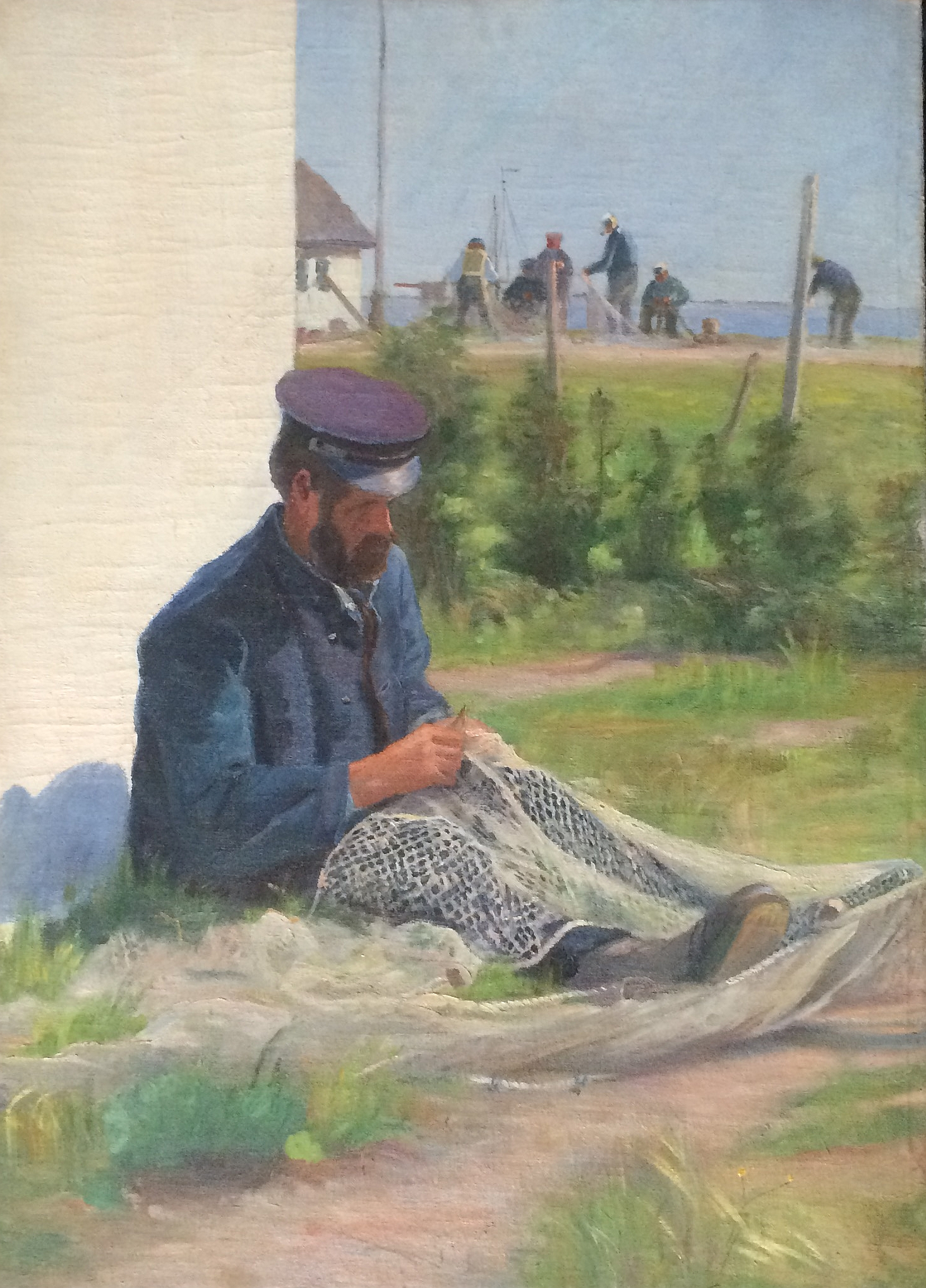
Fisherman at Hiddensee, Mending a Net

Clara Arnheim (24 April 1865 – 28 August 1942) was a German painter best known for her depictions of life among the fishermen on the Baltic coast. Her younger brother, Fritz Arnheim, was a noted historian.

== Biography ==
She was born in Berlin. She was of Jewish ancestry. Despite her family's resistance to the idea of a woman being a professional painter, she studied with Franz Skarbina in Berlin and Edmond Aman-Jean in Paris. Among the many organizations of which she was a member, the "Verein der Berliner Künstlerinnen" (an artists' society for women) and the Deutscher Künstlerbund are especially notable.

In 1914, on the occasion of the 150th anniversary of the Hochschule für Grafik und Buchkunst Leipzig, she displayed two graphic works at the "Internationalen Ausstellung für Buchgewerbe und Grafik" (BUGRA) and was awarded a gold medal.

At the beginning of the 1920s, she helped Henni Lehmann create the Blaue Scheune, an exhibition venue in Hiddensee, where she later took up residence. An organization known as the "Hiddensoer Künstlerinnenbund" was established, which numbered Elisabeth Andrae, Käthe Loewenthal, Katharina Bamberg and Elisabeth Büchsel among its members.

Following the Nazi seizure of power, she was served with a Berufsverbot and was unable to exhibit or accept commissions. Over the years, the harassment worsened until she found it almost impossible to obtain ration stamps. Luckily, her friends in Hiddensee were able to supply her with food in secret. The establishment of a ban against travel by Jews came while she was on a visit. Unable to return home, her resources dwindled and, in July 1942, she was transported to Theresienstadt, where she was put to death a few weeks later.
