= Käthe Loewenthal =

German painter

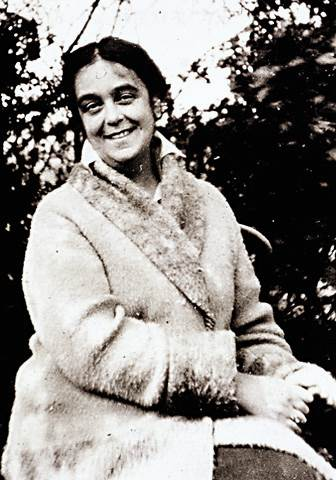
Käthe Loewenthal (date unknown)

Käthe Frida Rosa Loewenthal (27 March 1878, in Berlin – 26 April 1942, in Izbica) was a German Modernist landscape painter of Jewish ancestry. She was murdered in the Shoah. The Painter Susanne Ritscher was her sister.

== Biography ==
Her father Wilhelm Loewenthal was an ophthalmologist and hygienist. They moved frequently, living in Geneva, Lausanne, Paris and Berlin, as her father did work at various universities. The year 1890 found them in Bern, where she made friends with the family of a local pastor and converted to Protestantism.

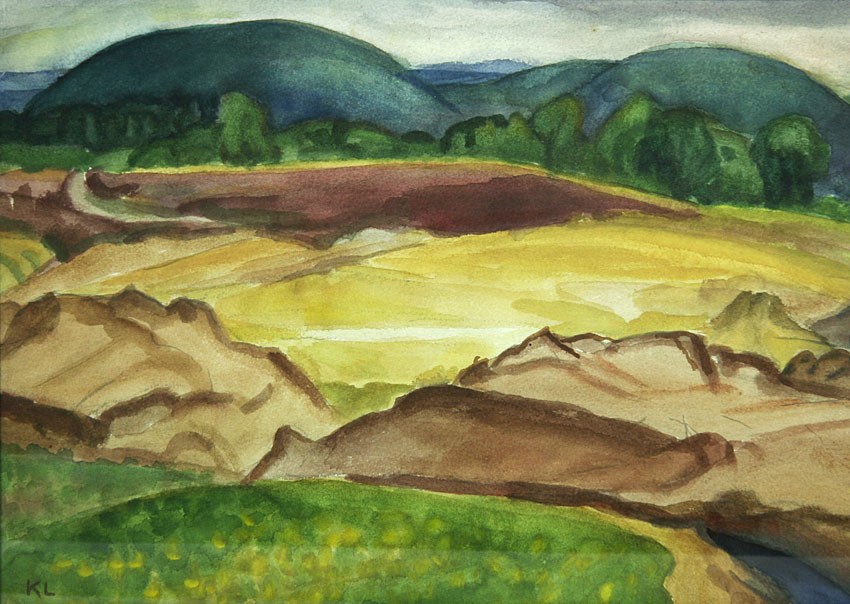
Bernese Alpine landscape

She also made the acquaintance of the Swiss Symbolist painter, Ferdinand Hodler, and developed an interest in art. After finishing her secondary education, she studied with him from 1895 to 1897. While visiting Paris, she met the German painter, Leo von König. She returned to Berlin with him and took lessons at his private school. She then studied at the art school founded by Wilhelm Feldmann in Mölln.

From 1904 to 1905, she worked as a freelance artist in Munich and took trips to the Bernese Highlands, which became a popular motif in her early paintings. In 1909, she moved to Stuttgart to join her friend, the painter Erna Raabe, Dame von Holzhausen. There, she studied at the State Academy of Fine Arts in the "Damenmalklasse" (Women's Class), taught by Adolf Hölzel, and took her academic degree in 1914.

In 1912 her sister, Susanne, had bought an old fisherman's house on Hiddensee. Käthe visited there regularly until 1934; becoming a member of the "Hiddensoer Künstlerinnenbund", which included Elisabeth Andrae, Katharina Bamberg, Clara Arnheim and Elisabeth Büchsel. She also exhibited at the Blaue Scheune, an art venue established by the painter and activist, Henni Lehmann.

In 1934, she was served with a "Malverbot" (painting forbidden), and was unable to exhibit or accept commissions. Her studio was closed and she was expelled from all the organizations she belonged to. Until 1941, she was still able to make occasional trips to Switzerland and paint in the Highlands. As the harassment became progressively worse, she secretly received support from friends in the art community and her former maid, Marie, who would later hide and save over 200 of her pastels and watercolors.

In 1941, she was removed from her apartment and placed in a "Judenhaus" (home for Jews). The following year, she was taken to a processing center in Lauterstein, then transported to the Izbica Ghetto, where she was murdered.

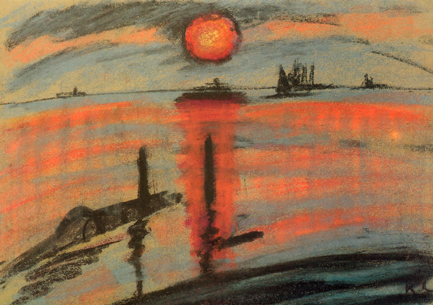
Sunset at Hiddensee

She is commemorated by stolpersteine in Hiddensee and Stuttgart. In 1993, a retrospective was held at Das Verborgene Museum (The Hidden Museum), an exhibition venue devoted to the work of female artists, sculptors, photographers and architects.
