= Bugri =

Bugri is a surname. Notable people with the surname include:

- Francis Bugri (born 1980), German footballer
- Sam Bugri (born 1943), Ghanaian sprinter

== See also ==
- Burgi (disambiguation)
