= Henni Lehmann =

German artist (1862–1937)

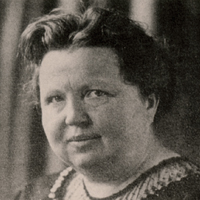
- Died: 18 February 1937
- Occupation: Artist

Henriette Lehmann, née Straßmann, known as Henni (10 October 1862, Berlin – 18 February 1937, Berlin) was a politically and socially active German painter and writer of Jewish ancestry.

== Biography ==
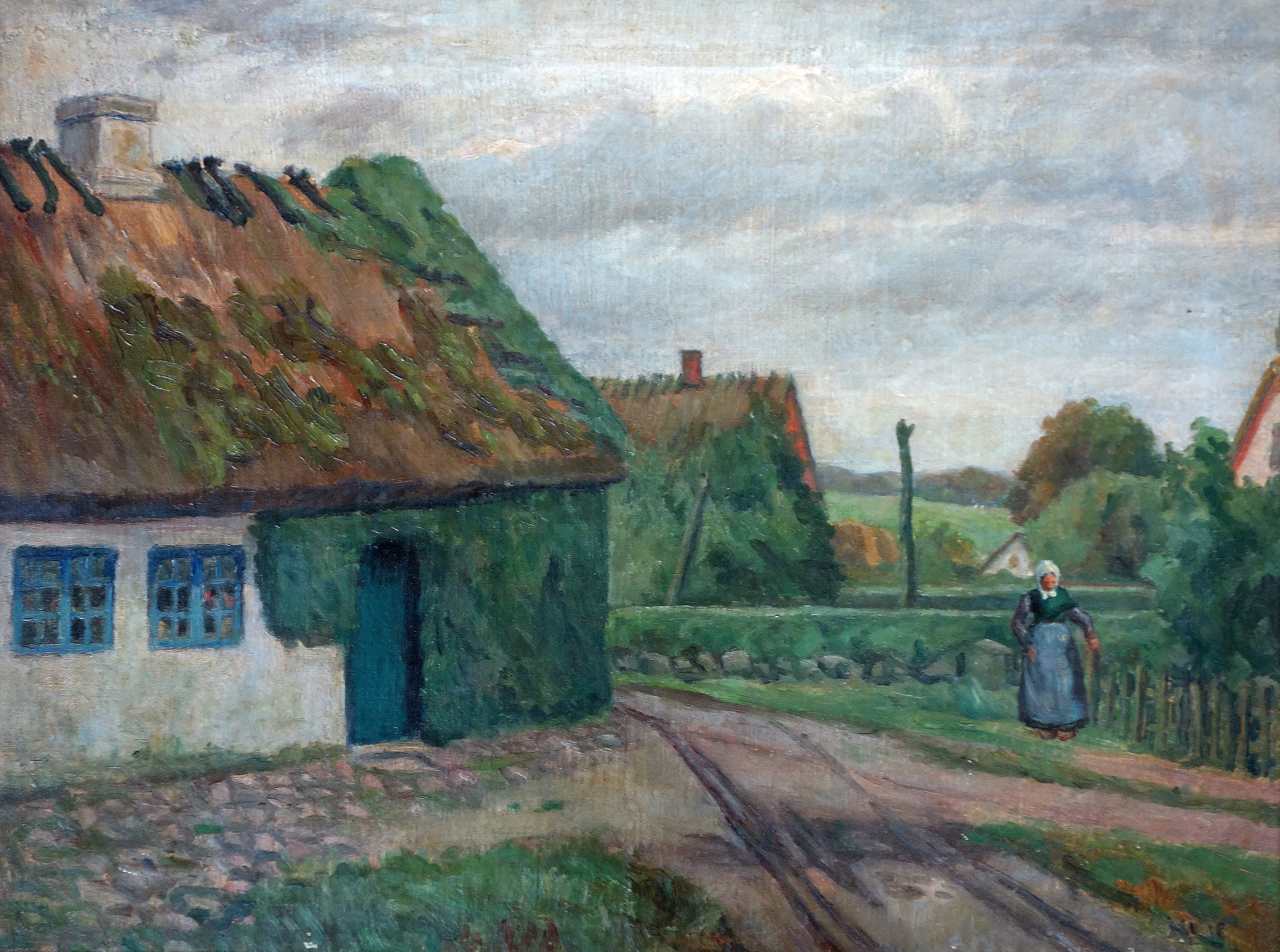
Farm Woman in Kloster (Hiddensee)

Her father, Wolfgang Straßmann, was a doctor and social activist who, for many years, was a member of the Prussian House of Representatives. In 1888, while attending the Royal School of Art, she met and married Karl Lehmann, a legal scholar. After the wedding, they both converted to Protestantism and moved to Rostock, where he had been appointed a professor at the University. In 1904, he was promoted to Rector. She became the chairperson of the Rostock Frauenverein (Women's Association).

After 1907, her family spent the summers at Hiddensee. Disturbed by the living conditions she found nearby, in 1913 she gave the islanders a loan to build a medical facility and, in 1914, became a founder and board member of the local "Natur- und Heimatschutzbundes" (Nature and Home Protection Confederation). During World War I, she headed the "Nationaler Frauendienst" a division of the "Vaterländischen Kriegshilfsdienst" (Patriotic War Support Service).

After her husband's death, she moved to Weimar, where she became involved with the Social Democratic Party. She also wrote socially committed novels and gave lectures against anti-Semitism. In 1920, she bought an old fachhallenhaus in Hiddensee and converted it to an art exhibition venue that was dubbed the Blaue Scheune (Blue Barn), after the color she chose for the exterior. It became the meeting place for the "Hiddensoer Künstlerinnenbund", a women's art association that included Clara Arnheim, Elisabeth Andrae, Käthe Loewenthal, Katharina Bamberg and Elisabeth Büchsel among its members. It remained active until the Nazi seizure of power in 1933.

Lehmann lived in her family's old summer home nearby for the rest of her life. Her death is generally believed to have been a suicide; possibly in response to the news that her daughter was dying of cancer.

After renovation, her house briefly served as the Vitte Town Hall and is now used for special events. Its walkway contains a stolperstein, dedicated to the Jewish artists who were persecuted by the Nazis.

Her son, Karl Leo Heinrich Lehmann, was an archaeologist, art historian and professor. Her daughter, Eva Fiesel, was a linguist and expert on Etruscan antiquities. Both emigrated to the United States in the early 1930s.

== Novels ==
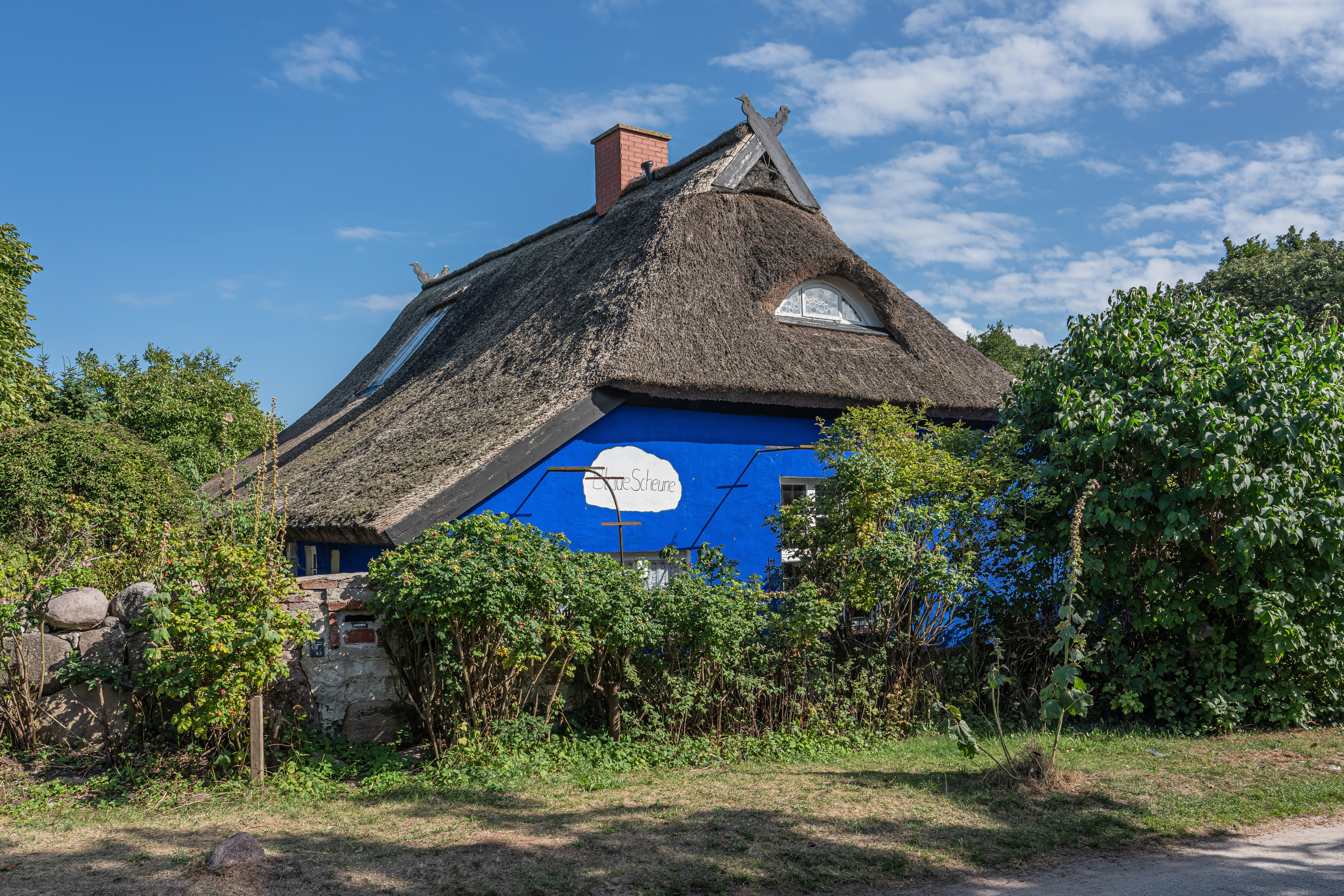
The Blaue Scheune in 2022

- Die Frauen aus dem Alten Staden Nr. 17 (The Women from Old Town #17), 1921, a proletarian-themed novel that was praised by Gerhart Hauptmann, reissued by Neisse Verlag, ISBN 978-3-86276-126-5
- Armenhauskinder (Poorhouse Children), 1924, reissued by Neisse Verlag, ISBN 978-3-86276-127-2
- Der Feldherr Ohne Heer (The Commander Without an Army), 1928, J.H.W. Dietz
