= Bhurji =

Bhurji may refer to:

- Egg bhurji, an Indian dish made of egg
- Bharbhunja (Hindu), an Indian caste
- Bhurji Khan, Indian vocalist

== See also ==
- Burji (disambiguation)
- Bharbhunja (disambiguation)
