= Burgis =

Burgis may refer to:

- Matīss Burģis, Latvian table tennis player
- Edward Ambrose Burgis, historian and theologian
- Burgis Beach, Saskatchewan, Canada
- Thomas Burgis II House, Guilford, Connecticut
- The Burji dynasty

== See also ==
- Burgi (disambiguation)
- Burji (disambiguation)
