= Löwendal =

Löwendal or Loewendal is a German surname. Notable people with the surname include:

- Benedicta Margaretha von Löwendal
- George Löwendal (1897–1964), Romanian painter and stage designer
- Ulrich Friedrich Woldemar von Löwendal, German officer and statesman
- Woldemar von Löwendal or Woldemar Løvendal (1660–1740), Danish-Norwegian baron, civil servant, and military officer, Governor-general and later Commanding General of Norway

== See also ==
- Löwenthal
