= Elisabeth Andrae =

German painter (1876–1945)

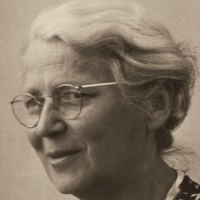
Elisabeth Andrae (1930s)

Louise Elisabeth Andrae (3 August 1876, Leipzig – 1945, Dresden) was a German Post-Impressionist landscape painter and watercolorist.

== Biography ==
She studied with two landscape painters; Gustav Adolf Thamm in Dresden and Hans von Volkmann in Karlsruhe. She settled in Dresden, but spent long periods on the island of Hiddensee.

There, she helped organize a group known as the "Hiddensoer Künstlerinnenbund", an association of women artists that included Clara Arnheim, Elisabeth Büchsel, Käthe Loewenthal and Katharina Bamberg.

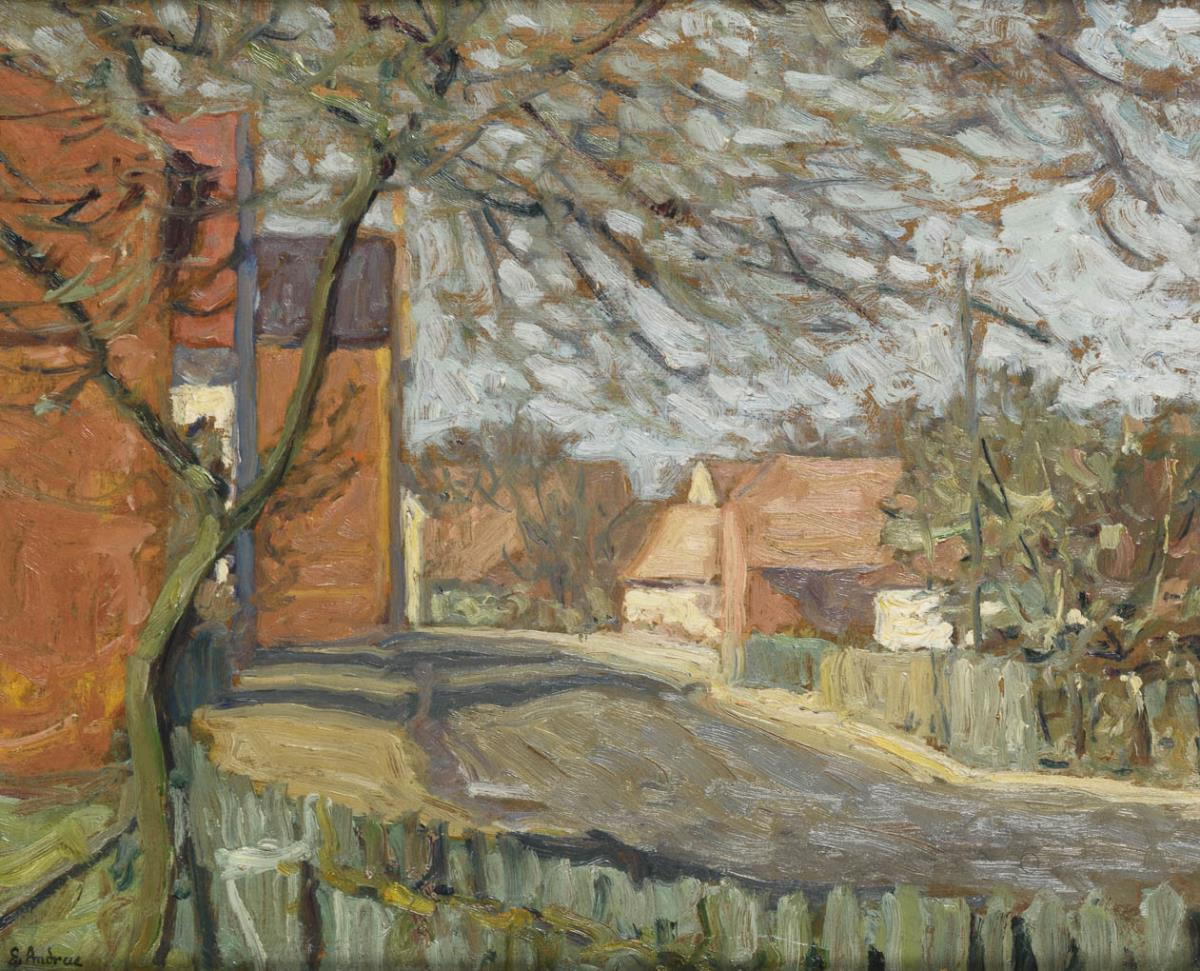
Village Street

They were regular exhibitors at an art venue known as the Blaue Scheune (Blue Barn), established in 1920 by Henni Lehmann. She also exhibited frequently with a group known as the "Kunstkaten" in Ahrenshoop.

Her brother was the archaeologist Walter Andrae, Curator and Director of the Vorderasiatisches Museum in Berlin. After 1930, she assisted him by painting large murals of several excavation sites in Babylon, Assur, Uruk and Yazılıkaya; two of which may still be seen at the museum.

Her works remained very popular during the Nazi years. She died at an unknown date in 1945, probably as a result of the bombing of Dresden or its aftermath.
