= Erna Raabe =

German artist

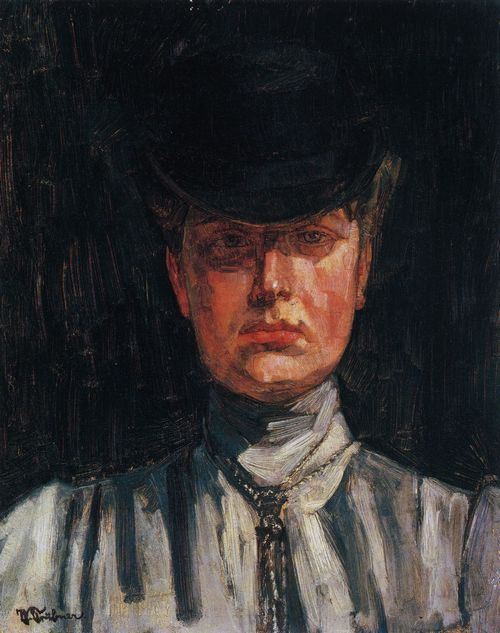
- Portrait by Wilhelm Trübner, 1901
- Born: Erna Raabe; 8 August 1882; Opava, Austria-Hungary
- Died: 1938 (aged 55–56); Greifswald, Germany

Erna Raabe, Dame von Holzhausen (1882–1938) was a German artist; known for portraits and animal paintings.

She studied at the Städelschule in Frankfurt am Main, from 1900 to 1902. Her primary instructor there was Wilhelm Trübner. After graduating, she took a trip to Italy, during which she developed a close relationship with her fellow artist, Käthe Loewenthal. In 1903, she settled in Stuttgart, where she continued her studies with Heinrich Altherr at the State Academy of Fine Arts.

In 1909, Loewenthal moved there. They lived together after 1914. Sometime around 1925, they took an extended trip to China and Japan. She was a member of the Stuttgart Secession, and exhibited frequently until 1932.

In the mid 1930s, she became seriously ill. Loewenthal cared for her and kept her paintings hidden from the Nazis. Raabe's feelings about National Socialism were never openly expressed, although the fact that Loewenthal was Jewish would certainly suggest that she was not a supporter.

She succumbed to her illness in the resort city of Greifswald in 1938.

== See also ==
- Käthe Loewenthal
- Wilhelm Trübner
- Heinrich Altherr
- Städelschule
- State Academy of Fine Arts Stuttgart
- German art
- Animal painting
- Portrait painting
