= Blaue Scheune =

Village of Vitte

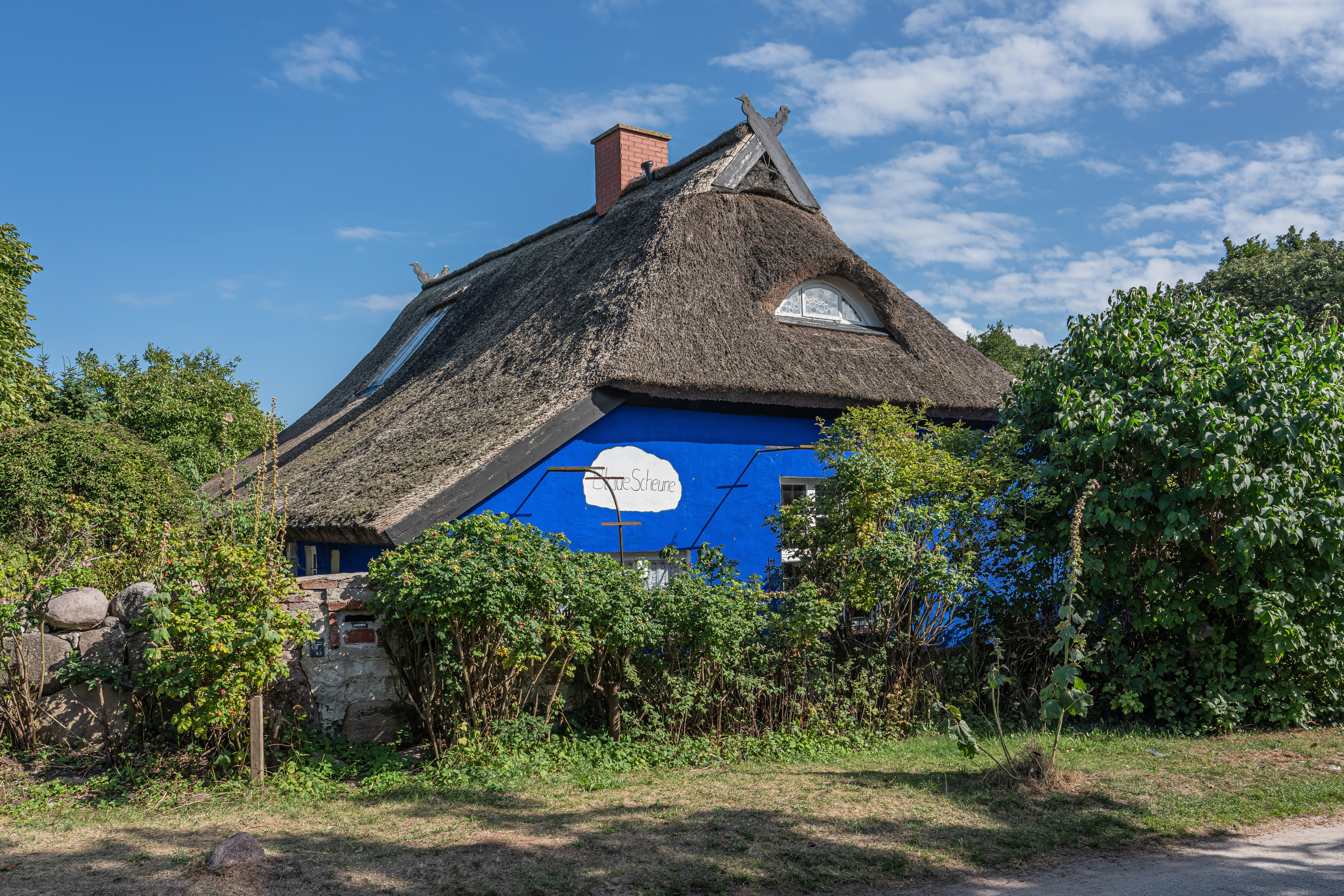
The Blaue Scheune in Vitte

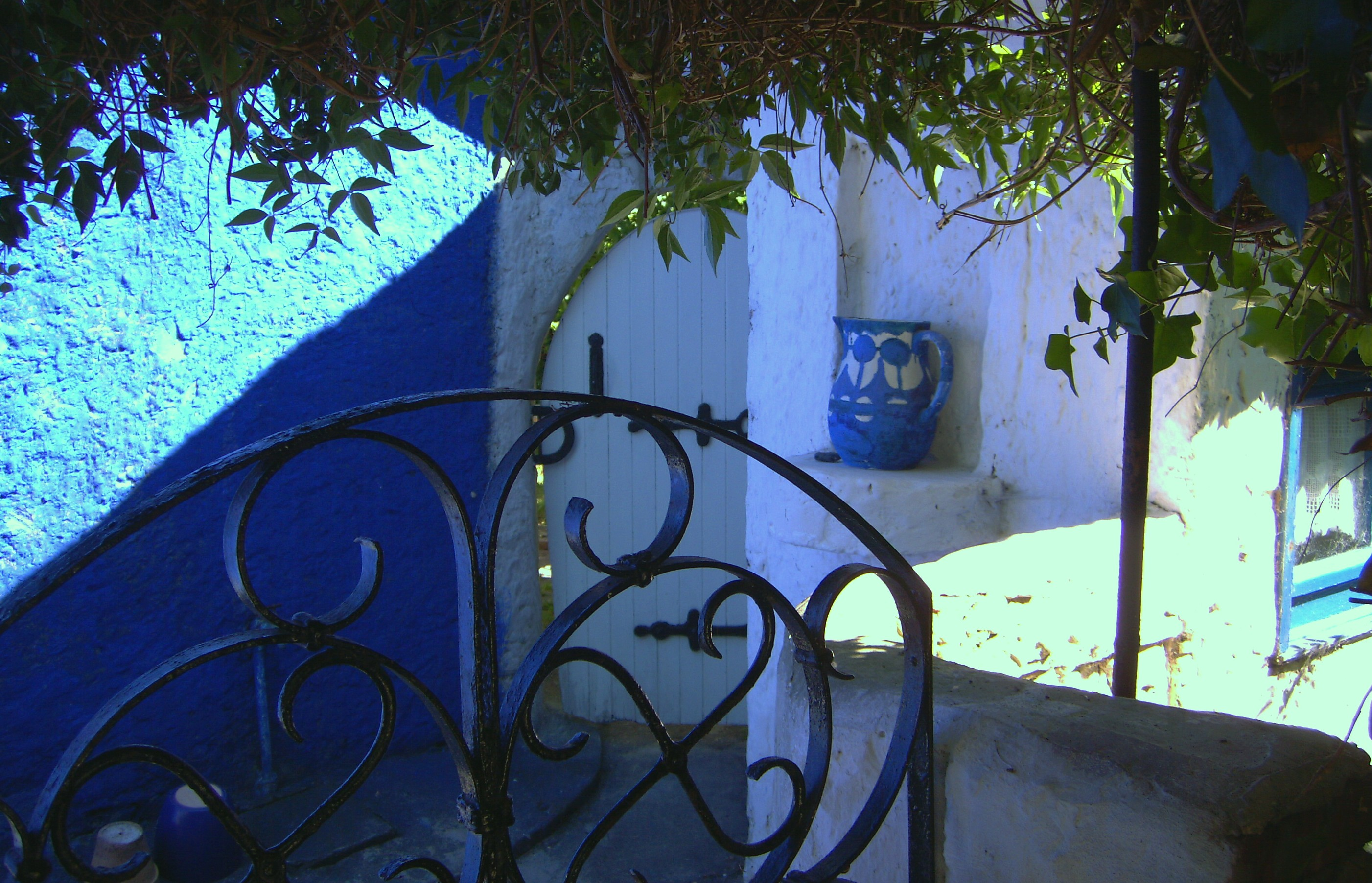
Rear of the building

The Blaue Scheune ('Blue Barn') in the village of Vitte on the German Baltic Sea island of Hiddensee was originally a Low German hall house from the early 19th century. It housed not only the barn, but also the bakery and the living area for a master miller and baker.

The artist, Henni Lehmann, bought the old building around 1920 and chose the blue colour to which the house owes its name today. The Blaue Scheune became well known as a result of regular exhibitions by the Hiddensee Women Artists' Federation (Hiddenseer Künstlerinnenbundes). This circle was closely linked to Katharina Bamberg, Clara Arnheim and Elisabeth Andrae as well as the best-known of Hiddensee's women artists, Elisabeth Büchsel.

In the 1950s the artist, Günter Fink (1913-2000), bought the historical residence. Since then it has become again a popular attraction for art lovers. The gallery is open to the public in the summer months twice a week (Wednesdays and Sundays).

The Blaue Scheune is the last surviving smokehouse (Rauchhaus), so called because it had no chimney and the smoke escaped through cracks and gaps in the roof.
