= Levental =

Levental is a surname of Yiddish origin, a variant of Löwenthal. Notable people with the surname include:

- Vadim Levental (born 1981), Russian editor and writer
- Valery Levental (1938–2015), Russian theatre designer
