= Burgi =

Burgi may refer to:

- Bürgi, German surname
- Burgui-Burgi, a Spanish town
- Burgi, plural of burgus, a type of Roman fortified watchtower

== See also ==
- 2481 Bürgi, an asteroid
- Burgie (1924–2019), American musician
- Burgis (disambiguation)
- Burji (disambiguation)
