= Fritz Arnheim =

German historian (1866–1922)

Fritz Arnheim (29 March 1866 – 19 June 1922) was a German historian, traveler, and lecturer.

Arnheim was born in Berlin, Brandenburg, Kingdom of Prussia and educated at the universities of Berlin and Halle. He made prolonged tours through Sweden, Belgium, and Norway (1900–12), and subsequently lectured on those countries. In 1915 he became an editor of the Mittheilungen aus der historischen litteratur.

His older sister, Clara Arnheim, was a well known painter.

== Selected works ==
He published a four volume translation of Henri Pirenne's Histoire de Belgique as Geschichte Belgiens (1899–1913). A few of his other writings are:

- "Beiträge zur Geschichte der Nordischen Frage in der zweiten Hälfte des 18. Jahrhunderts." In Deutsche Zeitschrift für Geschichtswissenschaft Bd. 2 (1889), S. 410–443; Bd. 5 (1891), S. 301–360; Bd. 8 (1892), S. 73–143 – Contributions to the history of the Nordic question in the second half of the 18th century.
- Der Ausserordentliche Finnländische Landtag of 1899. Die Antwortschreiben der Stände auf die Kaiserlichen Vorlagen über die Umgestaltung des Finnländischen Heerwesens. Translated from English in addition to a preamble. Leipzig, Duncker & Humblot, 1900 – The extraordinary Finnish Landtag 1899.
- Luise Ulrike, die schwedische Schwester Friedrichs des Großen. Ungedruckte Briefe an Mitglieder des preussischen Königshauses. 2 volumes, F. A. Perthes, Gotha 1909–1910 – Luise Ulrike, the Swedish sister of Frederick the Great. Unpublished letters to members of the Prussian royal family.
- Der Hof Friedrichs des Grossen (1912) – The court of Frederick the Great.
- Schweden. (= Perthes’ Kleine Völker- und Länderkunde. Volume 3) F. A. Perthes, Gotha 1917 – Sweden.
