= Wolfgang Straßmann =

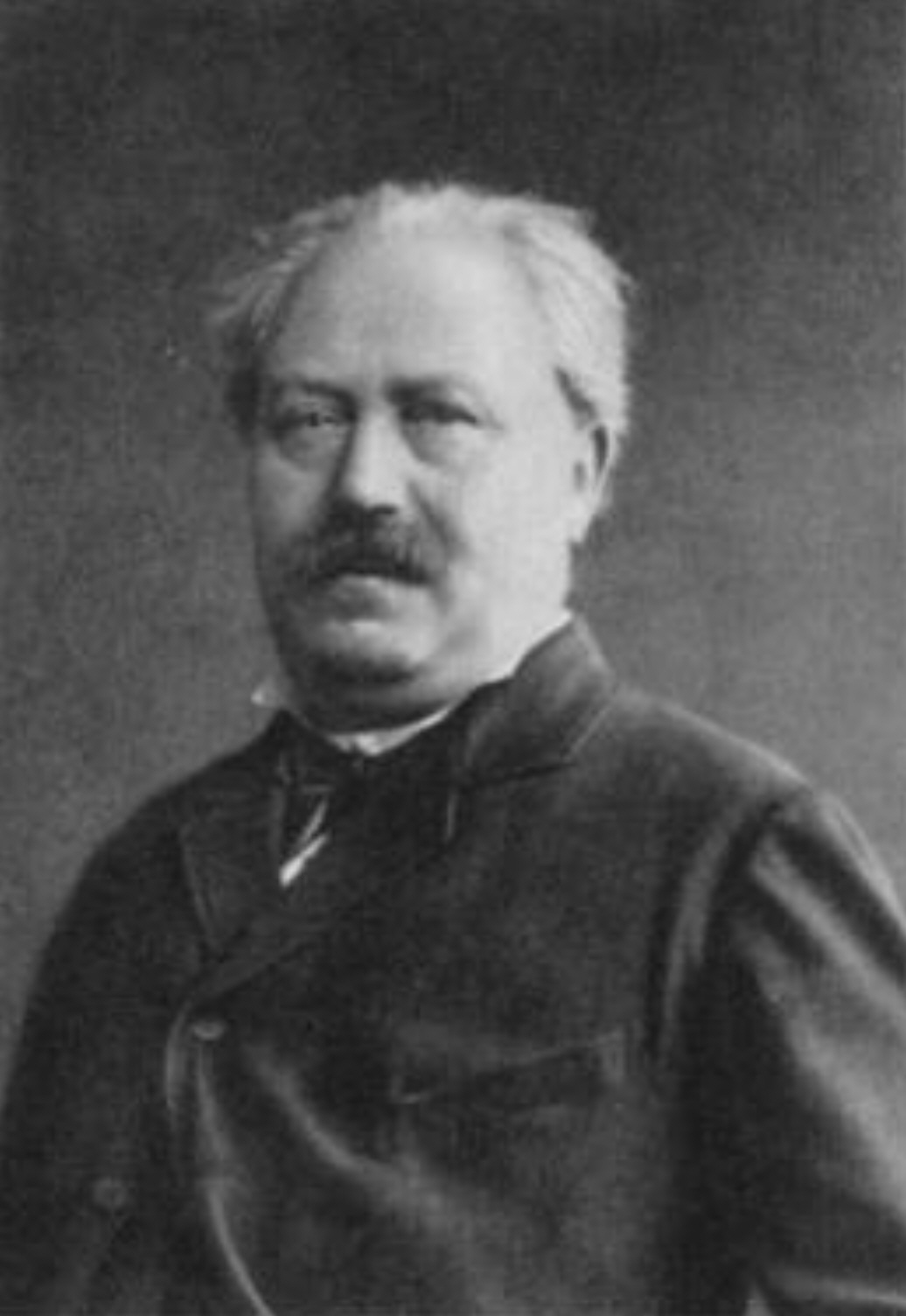

Member of the Berlin town Council
- In office 1863–1885

President of the Berlin town Council
- In office 1875–1885

Member of the Prussian House of Representatives
- In office 1877–1885

Personal details
- Born: 8 October 1821 Rawitsch, Province of Posen, Kingdom of Prussia
- Died: 6 December 1885 (aged 64) Berlin, Germany
- Party: German Progress Party
- Spouse: Louise Cohen (1835–1889)
- Children: Henni Lehmann; Wolf Strassmann
- Education: University of Breslau; Humboldt University of Berlin
- Occupation: physician

Wolfgang Straßmann (8 October 1821 – 6 December 1885) was a German medical doctor and liberal politician. He fought in the March Revolution of 1848 and the First Schleswig War. In 1877, he became a member of the Prussian House of Representatives and from 1875 to 1885, he was the President of the Berlin town Council.

== Biography ==
Wolfgang Straßmann was born to Heiman Straßmann (1797–1881), a Jewish scholar, and Judith née Guhrauer (1795–1875) in Rawitsch, Kingdom of Prussia (Rawicz, Poland), where he attended elementary school. His secondary education took place in Lissa (Leszno, Poland) and at the Elisabet-Gymnasium in Breslau (Wrocław).

Straßmann started to study philosophy at the University of Breslau but moved to the Friedrich Wilhelm University in Berlin to study medicine. He worked for Johann Friedrich Dieffenbach in his clinical clerkship.

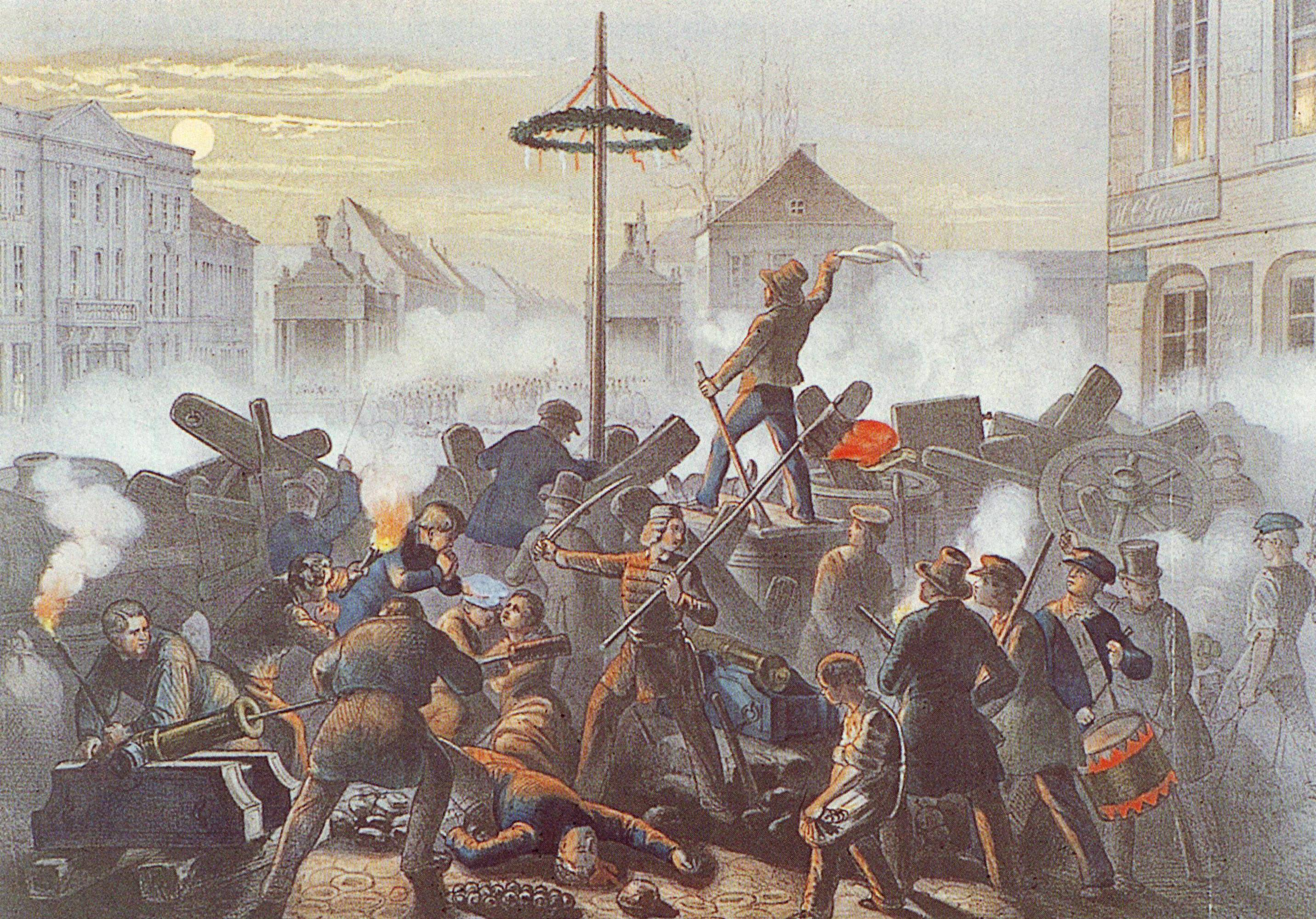
Barricades at Königstrasse, Berlin in March 1848

In the March Revolution of 1848, Straßmann fought on the barricades at Berlin's Königstrasse. On 18 March 1848 Prussian troops under the command of Karl von Prittwitz stormed the barricades, Straßmann and eight of his comrades managed to hide in the house of Meno Burg. Straßmann fled to the upper floor and was hidden in the bed of a servant girl while his comrades were executed by Prussian troops. On 12 August 1848, Straßmann walked along the Unter den Linden in a group of revolutionaries which started to wrest Prussian cockades from other promenaders. At the Café Kranzler, he finally addressed the crowd, declared the Hohenzollern dynasty "no longer worthy of the throne of Prussia" and proclaimed the German Republic. He was arrested the same day, sentenced to six weeks imprisonment and banished from Berlin.

Straßmann moved to Schleswig-Holstein and volunteered in the First Schleswig War as a medic in the German Federal Army under the command of Karl von Prittwitz. After the withdrawal of the Federal Army, he remained within the Schleswig-Holstein troops as a lieutenant, fought in the Battle of Idstedt and was decorated for bravery.

In 1854, he returned to Berlin and graduated in 1855. Initially not allowed to practice in Berlin, he volunteered as a medic in a cholera outbreak in Stralau (today part of Berlin-Friedrichshain), at that time just outside of Berlin's city limits. From 1856 to 1885 Straßmann practiced as a physician in Berlin.

Straßmann was elected as a member of Berlin's city council representing the German Progress Party in 1863, from 1875 until his death in 1885 he was the council's President. He collaborated with Rudolf Virchow and was especially active in the field of medical care and education of the poor. Straßmann initiated the construction of septic drain fields in Berlin.

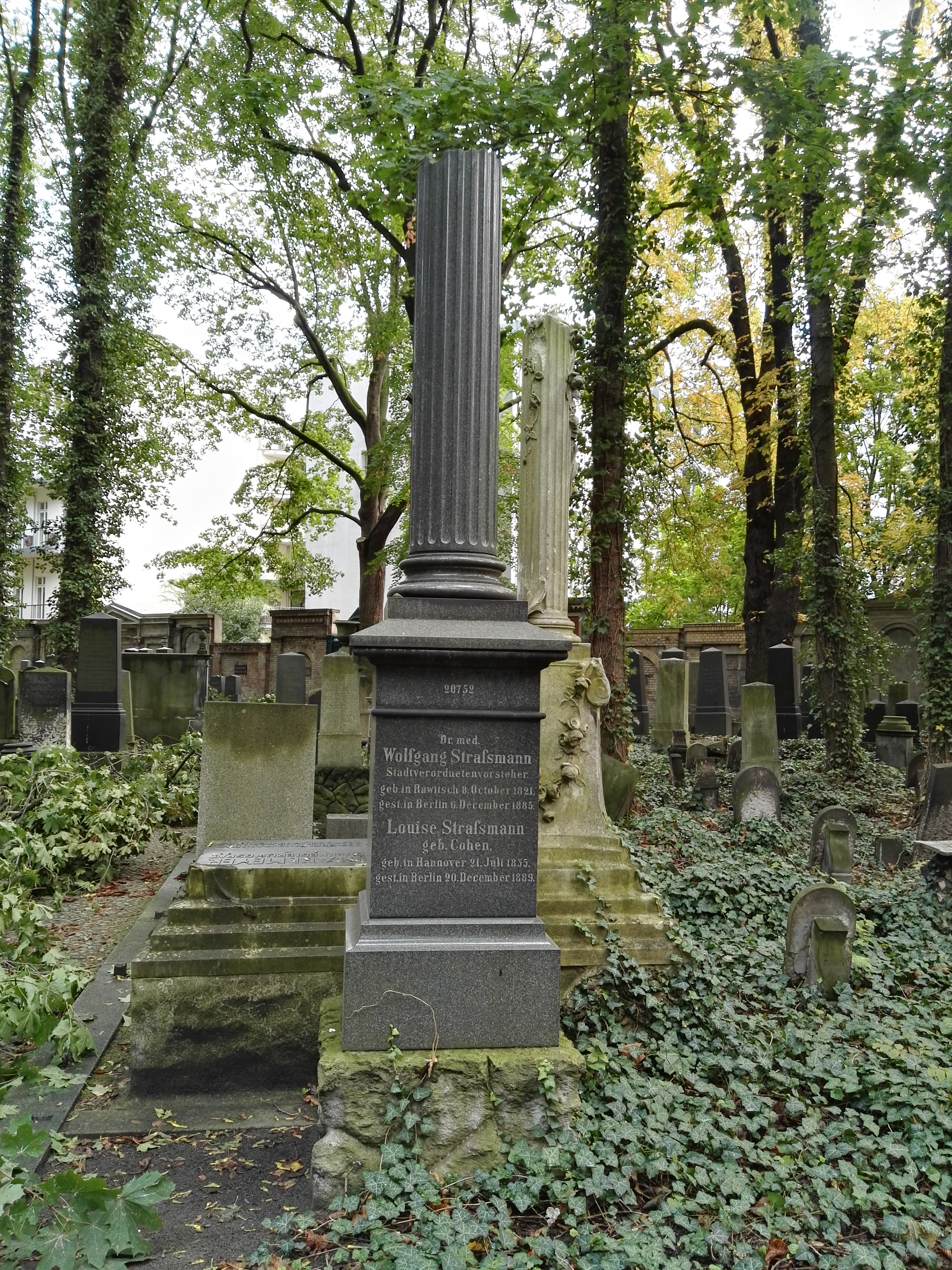
Straßmann's grave, Jewish cemetery Berlin-Prenzlauer Berg

In 1877, Straßmann became a member of the Prussian House of Representatives. Straßmann supported the separation of church and state which made him a target to antisemitic attacks of court chaplain Adolf Stoecker in 1883.

Straßmann was married to Louise Cohen (1835–1889) from 1862 until his death in 1885. Their daughter Henni Lehmann became a well-known painter. His son Wolf died aged 35.

A funeral service for Wolfgang Straßmann was held in Berlin's City Hall, with Rudolf Virchow giving the eulogy.

== Awards ==
- Order of the Red Eagle IV class

His portrait in the gallery of presidents of the town council in Berlin's City Hall was destroyed by the Nazis in the 1930s, the Straßmannstrasse in Friedrichshain-Kreuzberg was named in his honor on 4 August 1897 and, after being renamed by the Nazis in 1938, again in 1947.
