= Wilhelm Feldmann =

German painter

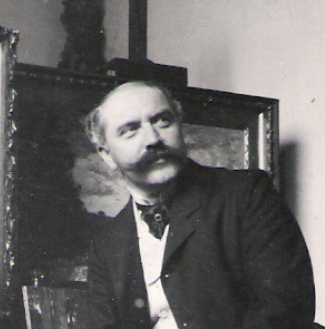
Wilhelm Feldmann (date unknown)

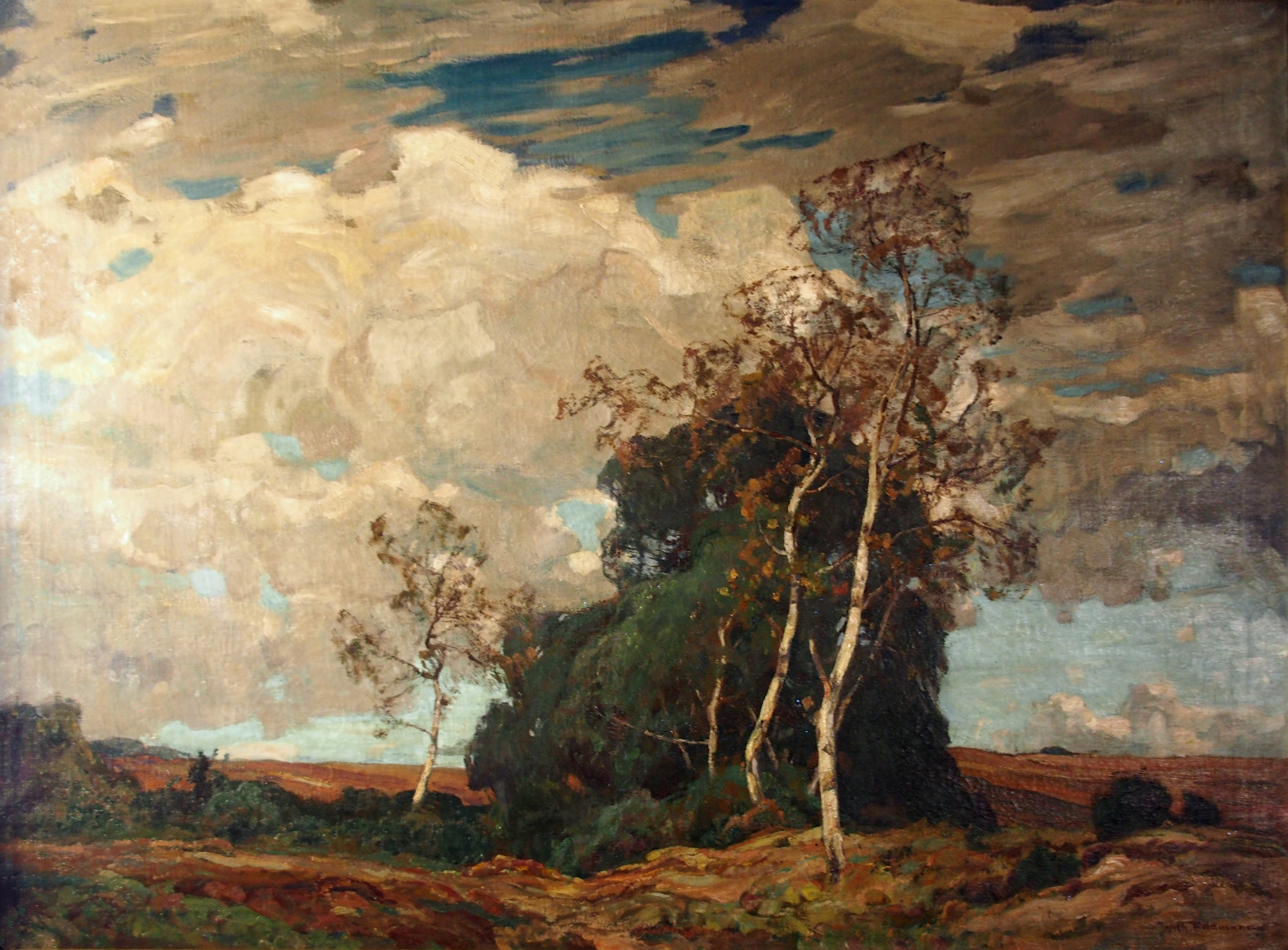
Heather Landscape

Wilhelm Feldmann (1 December 1859 – 10 October 1932) was a German landscape painter, etcher, and lithographer.

== Life and work ==
He was born in Lüneburg. His father was a master locksmith. He attended the Johanneum Lüneburg until 1878, without graduating. That same year, however, he was accepted for the antiquities class at the Academy of Fine Arts, Munich. In 1883, he transferred to the Academy of Fine Arts, Karlsruhe, where he became a student of the landscape painter, Gustav Schönleber. In 1886 he transferred again, to the Academy of Arts, Berlin, where he spent four years completing his landscape studies with Eugen Bracht. He also studied with the graphic artist, Hans Meyer, who taught him etching and lithography.

In 1887, he received an award from the Dresden Watercolor Academy. Two years later, he was presented with the Menzel Foundation award. The Berlin Academy gave him a special award in 1890, for his etching of the Rudelsburg.

From 1890 to 1902, he worked in Berlin, as a free-lance landscape artist and etcher. He was awarded a small gold medal at the Große Berliner Kunstausstellung of 1895. He lived in Mölln from 1903 to 1911, and established an art school there in 1905. He moved again in 1911, to Lübeck; making visits to paint in Israelsdorf and at the Gothmund Artists' Colony.

The Lüneburg Heath is a recurring motif in his works. By the 1900s, he was the best known painter of heath landscapes. In 1929, the Lübeck Behnhaus provided him with a separate room for his works. This was very likely his last exhibition. He was also a longstanding member of the Hamburger Künstlerverein von 1832. After his death, he was largely forgotten.

His works may be seen at the National Gallery (Berlin), the Behnhaus in Lübeck, the Möllner Museum, the Bomann-Museum in Celle, and the Albert-König-Museum in Unterlüß.

== Sources ==
- Klaus Homann: Maler sehen die Lüneburger Heide., Albert-König-Museum, Unterlüß 2008, ISBN 978-3-927399-39-6
- Ewald Bender, "Feldmann, Wilhelm", In: Allgemeines Lexikon der Bildenden Künstler von der Antike bis zur Gegenwart, Vol. 11: Erman–Fiorenzo, E. A. Seemann, Leipzig 1915 (Online)
- "Professor Wilhelm Feldmanns 70. Geburtstag", in: Vaterstädtische Blätter, illustrierte Unterhaltungsbeilage der Lübeckischen Anzeigen, 1929, Nr. 5
- Wulf Schadendorf: Museum Behnhaus. Das Haus und seine Räume. Malerei, Skulptur, Kunsthandwerk (Museum catalog), Museum für Kunst u. Kulturgeschichte d. Hansestadt, Lübeck 1976, pg.56
- Birgit Steinke: "Feldmann, Wilhelm". In: Biografisches Lexikon Herzogtum Lauenburg, Eckardt Opitz (Ed.), Husum Druck- und Verlagsgesellschaft, 2015, pg.146 ISBN 978-3-89876-778-1
