= Del Loewenthal =

Psychotherapist

Del Loewenthal (born 3 October 1947) is a British psychotherapist who is emeritus professor of psychotherapy and counselling at the University of Roehampton, London. He is also Chair of the Southern Association of Counselling and Psychotherapy and founding editor of the European Journal of Psychotherapy and Counselling.

== Career ==
Loewenthal was Director of the Research Centre for Therapeutic Education until October 2018 when he became Emeritus Professor and convener of the Doctoral Programmes in Psychotherapy and Counselling in the Department of Psychology at Roehampton University.

Loewenthal has been on the UKCP register since 1996 (Analytic Section, Philadelphia Association) and is also a Chartered Counselling Psychologist (BPS) and Health and Care Professions Council (HCPC) Registered.

Alongside his career as a psychotherapist and educator, Loewenthal has had an interest in photography and completed a BA degree in Photography and Multimedia at the University of Westminster and subsequently an MA in Documentary Photography and Photojournalism at the University of Arts/London College of Communication. Loewenthal has nurtured his interest in photography into seminal work on phototherapy and therapeutic photography with publications including The Handbook of Phototherapy and Therapeutic Photography for the Professional and Activist Client (2023, Routledge), The Therapeutic Use of Photographs in the United Kingdom criminal Justice System in the European Journal for Psychotherapy and Counselling (2015); Talking Pictures Therapy as Brief Therapy in a School Setting, Journal of Creativity in Mental Health (2013); and has edited Phototherapy and Therapeutic Photography in a Digital Age (2013, Routledge).

== Research interests ==
Loewenthal's interests are broadly on the implications of continental philosophy for professional practice, theory and research. They include such areas as:

- The training of psychological therapists
- Post-Existentialism/Post-Phenomenology
- Phototherapy
- Relational learning, ethics and research
- Emotional Learning and Involvement

== Selected works ==
Loewenthal has authored books including:

- The Handbook of Phototherapy and Therapeutic Photography: For the professional and activist client (2023, Routledge)
- Existential Psychotherapy and Counselling after Post-Modernism: The selected works of Del Loewenthal; World Library of Mental Health (2017, Routledge)
- Post-existentialism and the psychological therapies: Towards a therapy without foundations (2011, Karnac)
- Case Studies in Relational Research (2007, Macmillan Palgrave)

He has also been the editor of several books including:

- Psychotherapy and Unstable Notions of Masculinity (2023, Routledge)
- Levinas and the Other in Psychotherapy and Counselling (2022, Routledge)
- Toxic Young Adulthood: Therapy and Therapeutic Ethos (2022, Routledge)
- What is Paranormal? Some Implications for Psychological Therapies (2022, Routledge)
- Critical Existential-Analytic Psychotherapy: Some implications for practices, theories and research (2021, Routledge)
- Love, Sex and Psychotherapy in a Post-Romantic Era (2020, Routledge)
- Critical Psychotherapy, Psychoanalysis and Counselling: Implications for practice (2015, Palgrave Macmillan)
- Phototherapy and Therapeutic Photography in a Digital Age (2013, Routledge)
