= Meno Burg =

Prussian Army officer (1789–1853)

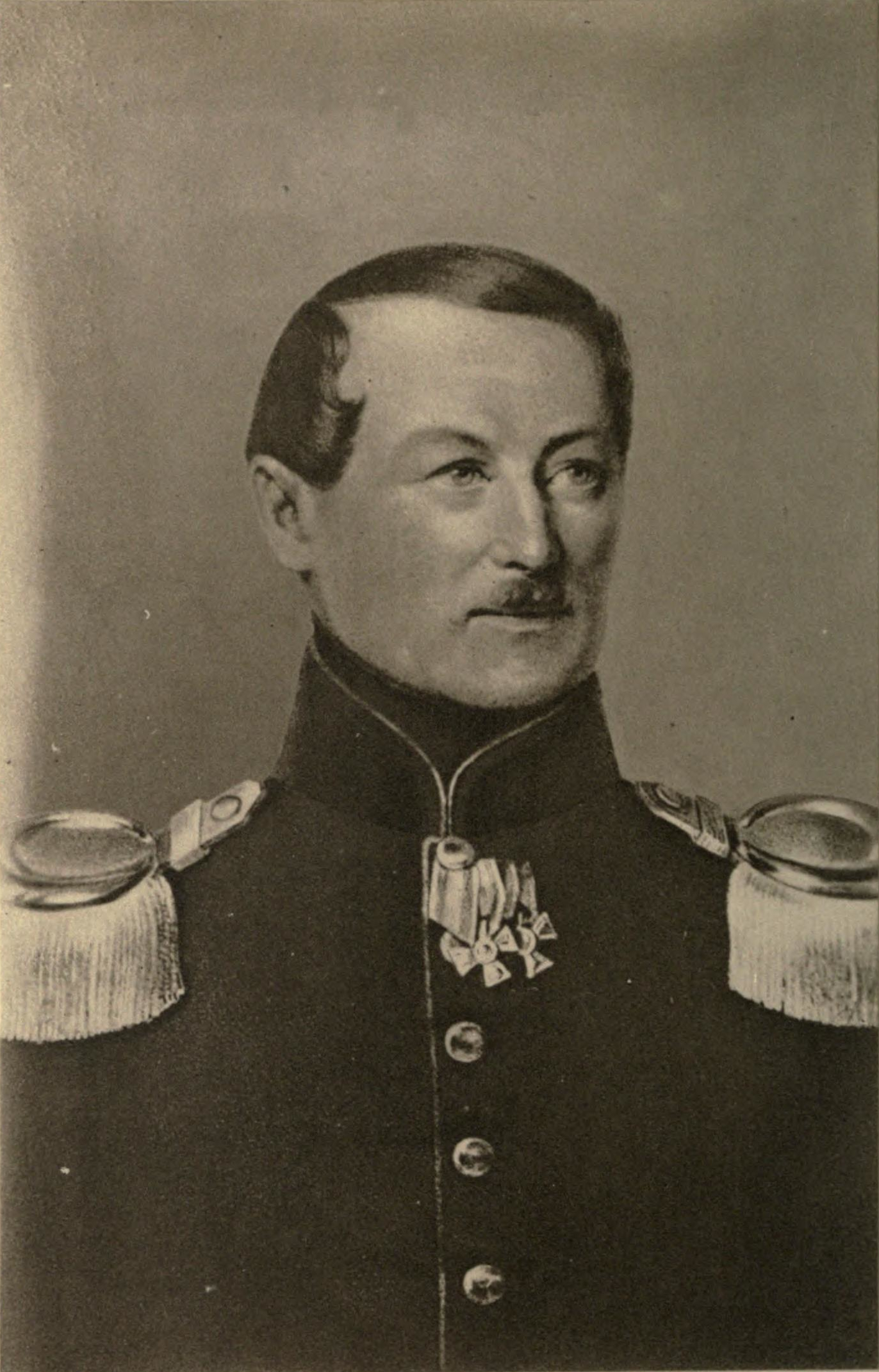
- Major Meno Burg
- Born: September 19, 1789; Berlin
- Died: August 26, 1853 (aged 63); Berlin
- Military career
- Allegiance: Prussia
- Branch: Prussian Army
- Service years: 1813–1847
- Rank: "Character of a Major"
- Nickname: Judenmajor
- Units: United Artillery and Engineer School
- Awards: Order of the Red Eagle IV. Class
- Other work: Publications on the art of drawing; autobiography

Meno Burg (9 October 1789 – 26 August 1853), known as the Judenmajor (Jew major), was a Prussian Army officer. Burg reached the highest rank ever attained by a Jew in the Prussian army during the 19th century. However, his military career was marred by constant antisemitism.

== Education and civilian career ==
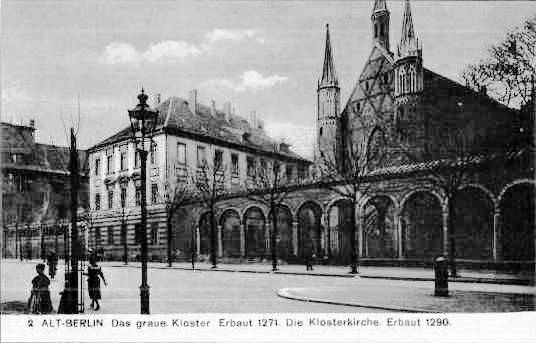
Berlinisches Gymnasium zum Grauen Kloster

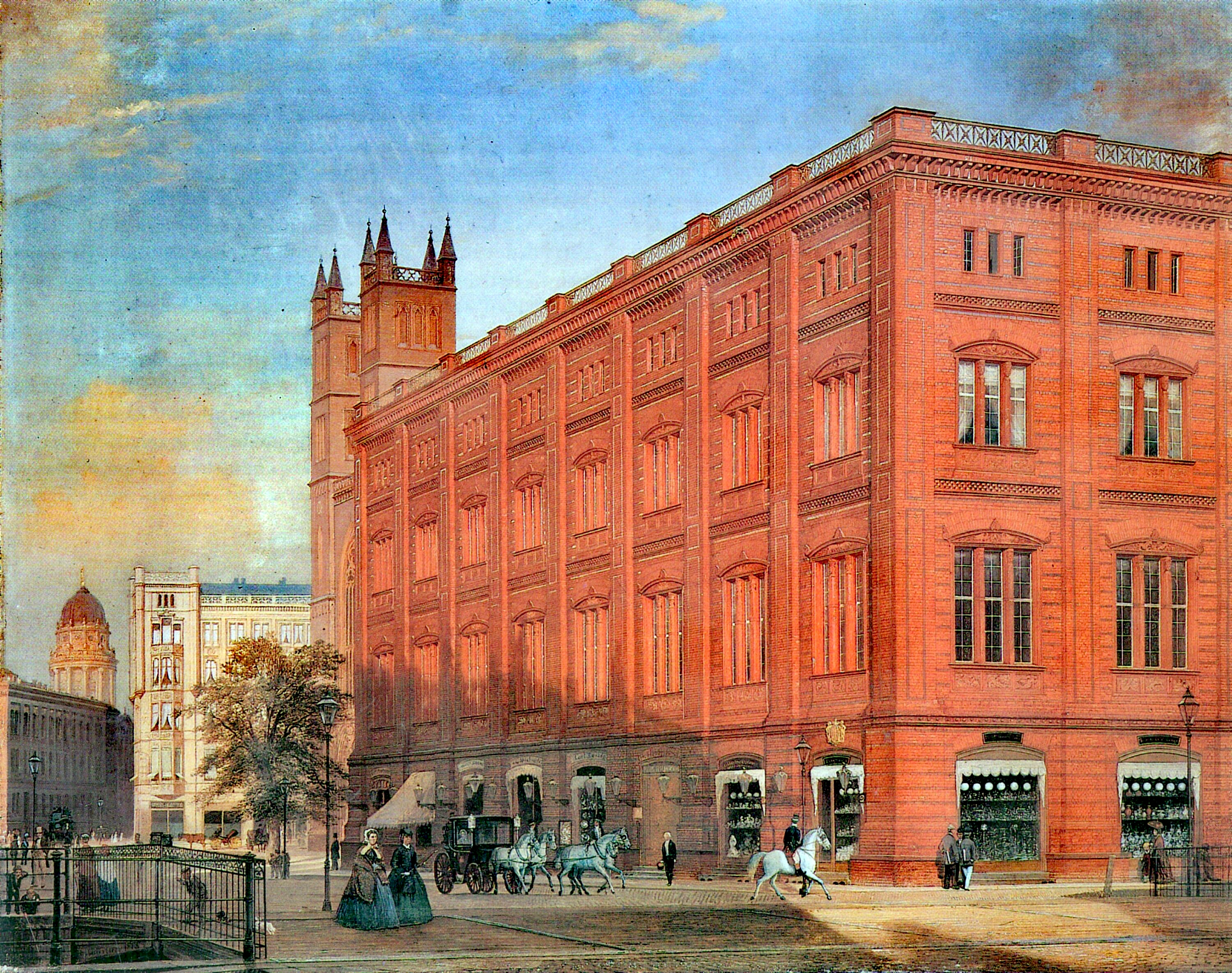
Berliner Bauakademie

Meno Burg was born into a Jewish family of poor circumstances in Berlin, Margraviate of Brandenburg. After visiting Jewish schools, Burg entered in December 1802 the Berlin Municipal School (German: Berliner Stadtschule), a secondary school later known as Gymnasium zum Grauen Kloster. He left the school in 1804 to become an apprentice to his cousin Salomo Sachs, a royal building inspector. He visited the Berlin Building Academy (German: Berliner Bauakademie), where he finished in 1807 the exam as field-surveyor (German: Kondukteur und Feldmesser). Like his cousin who was the first Jew who had entered the Prussian civil service under Frederick William II, Burg became a civil servant under Frederick William III. In doing so, Burg had entered into a field which was outside of the professions Jews were allowed to enter in Prussia according to the prevailing regulations of the 'Revised General Concession and Regulation' (German: Revidierte General Privilegium und Reglement) dated 17 April 1750. (Note: All Prussian Jews were subject to these regulations. The authorities protected and tolerated them, as long as they were protected Jews (German: Schutzjuden) and as long as they complied with the requirements of this law. They were only allowed to work in specific professions – like merchandize trade, peddling, and factorage – or in crafts which were not controlled by the professional guilds. Usually all other additional work permits and royal concessions needed to be acquired from the government. There were no restrictions for Jews to visit public schools and universities.) It appears that due to the political circumstances, the regulations governing the Jews in Prussia were not strictly followed. According to the legal situation at the time, Burg could have been denied to enter his chosen profession. (Note: Half a century later and under much more favorable legal circumstances, a Jewish surveying student received the adverse decision that he had no right to a government position, after he had been accepted to the swearing-in as a field-surveyor and after he had passed his exam.) Burg was already a government employee, when the new Prussian civil rights legislation for Jews (German: Edikt vom 11. März 1812 betreffend der bürgerlichen Verhältnisse der Juden in dem Preußischen Staate) was enacted on 11 March 1812. This law naturalised Jewish inhabitants of Prussia as Prussian citizens, a franchise established in 1810 when doing away with the prior estates (nobility, serfs, burghers, Huguenots, etc.), but the admission to government positions was not called for and was reserved for future legislation.

== Enlistment in the Prussian Army during the War of Liberation ==
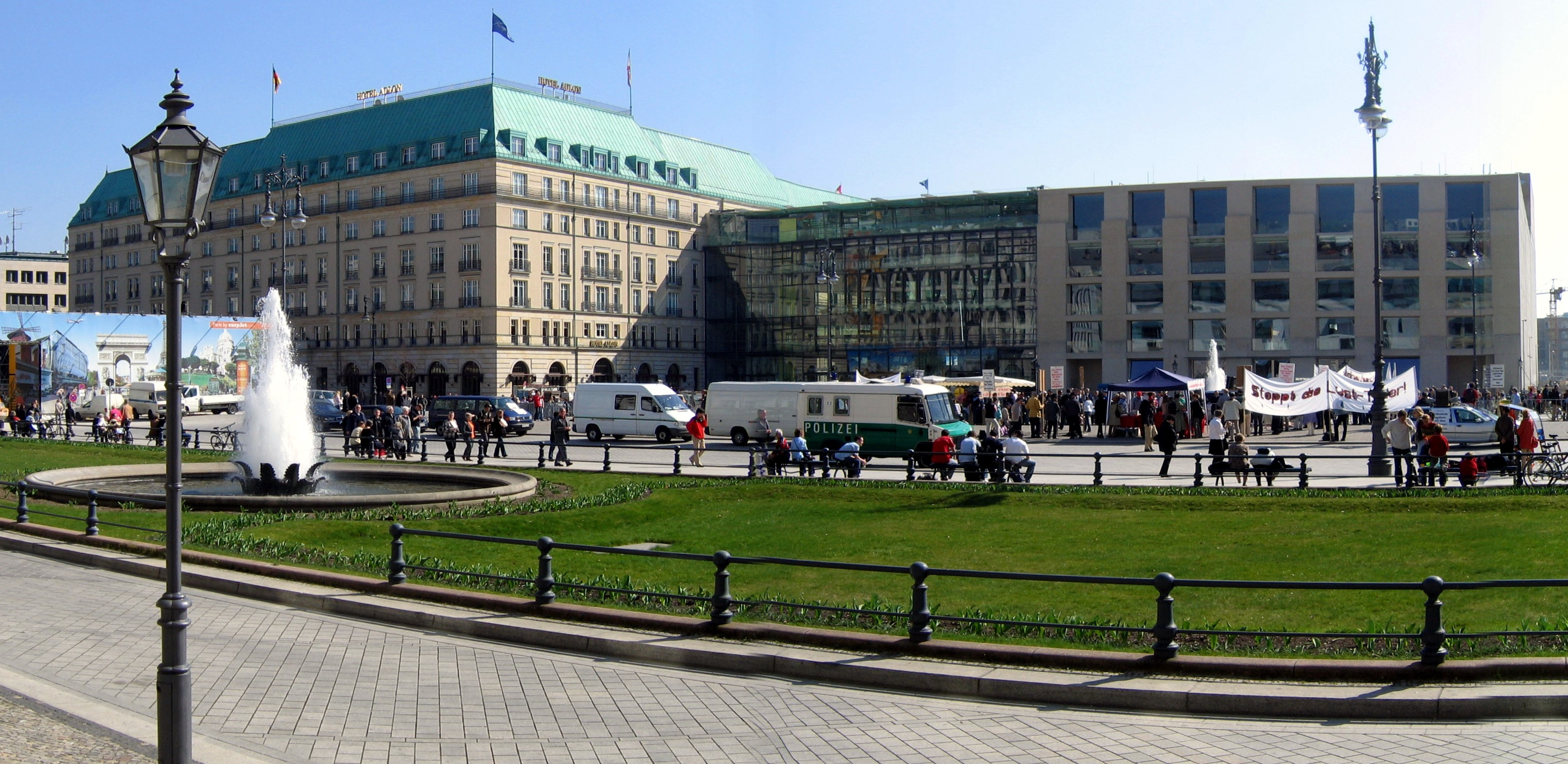
Akademie der Künste

Burg was awaiting his final exam at the Prussian Academy of Arts in Berlin, when he volunteered on 14 February 1813 for the military service to fight for 'Prussia's freedom and rebirth', as he put it. The troop of his choice was the Guard Infantry Battalion (German: Garde-Normal-Bataillon) in Breslau, an elite unit of the infantry. After only a few days, he was discharged from this unit on the grounds that Jews were "under the existing laws and the prevailing circumstances" not allowed to serve in the Guard. The rejection of Jewish soldiers in the Guard appears to have been a matter of course for the established circles. State Chancellor Karl August von Hardenberg, usually a supporter of equal rights for the Jews, left Burg's two requests for re-enlistment in the Guard unanswered. Hereupon, Burg decided to apply for the artillery, a branch of the service which was considered less prestigious by the Prussian nobility and more suitable for the middle-classes. To avoid risking another discharge, Burg applied to the service chief of the artillery (German: Generalinspekteur der Artillerie), Prince August of Prussia, who secured for him an admission. Since Burg's accomplishments were widely recognized, the lieutenants of his unit recommended him after just nine months of service to become an officer. However, the promotion was vetoed by the base commander (German: Platzkommandant) Captain Karl Moritz Ferdinand von Bardeleben, (Note: Moritz Karl Ferdinand von Bardeleben became later lieutenant general and commander of Koblenz; as such, he served on the board of the local Masonic lodge.) stating that "as long as (he) had something to say, no Jew shall be officer in the artillery". Consequently officer cadets, who had been trained by Burg, were promoted before him. Even his transfer to a combat unit did not help him to get promoted earlier. Only a mention of bravery could have accelerated his promotion, but his unit was not deployed to the front.

Burg was not the first Prussian officer of Jewish faith. (Note: Gay & Gay (1994) mistakenly claim that Burg was the first Jewish officer in the Prussian army.) Other Prussian Jews had already become officers at the beginning of the war. They were soldiers in combat units who had been promoted during combat, or they belonged to the militia, the Free Corps (German: Jägerdetachements) or the Landwehr (National Guard). (Note: These formations had different rules for advancement than in the regular army.) Burg became finally second lieutenant on 18 August 1815 and was transferred to the First Artillery Brigade (East Prussia) in Danzig as a company officer.

== Officer during the Restoration ==
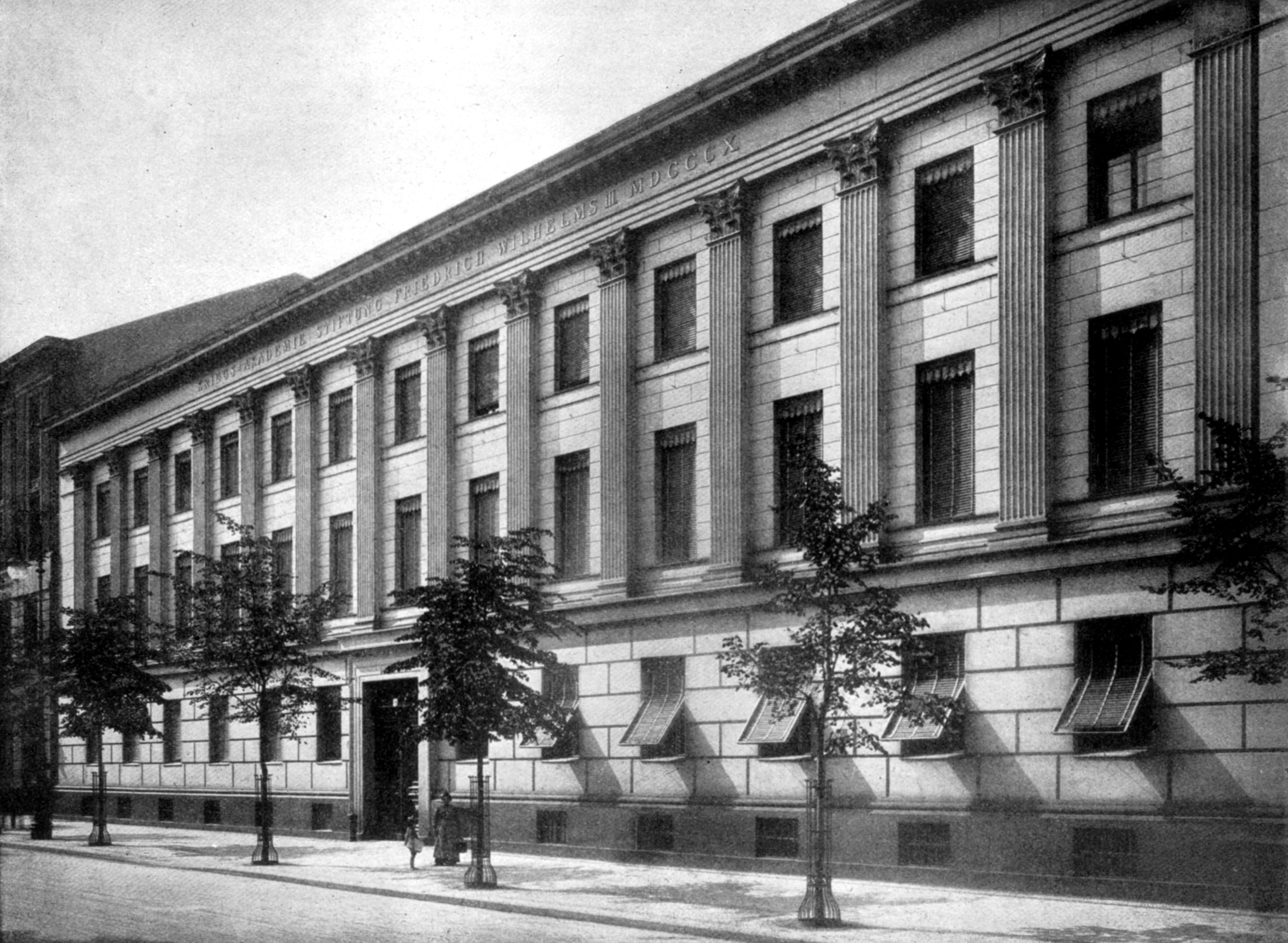
Vereinigte Artillerie- und Ingenieurschule

Since 1816 as an instructor at the United Artillery and Engineer School (German: Vereinigte Artillerie- und Ingenieurschule) in Berlin, Burg's principal subject of instruction was drawing and geometry, on which science he wrote a text-book that attained great popularity, being frequently republished and translated into several languages. On 4 July 1826, Burg was promoted to first lieutenant, on time and according to his seniority. It is noteworthy that Burg received his promotion, while other Jewish volunteers, who claimed their legitimate rights to employment in the civil service, had been rejected because of their faith.

Despite the highest protection by August Prince of Prussia, Burg nearly had not been promoted to the rank of a captain. In this promotion drama, Burg initially had to compromise to be promoted to the rank of a "captain of the army" only, a rank that was not equivalent to a captain of the artillery. Then he was invited to be baptized, to make the promotion possible, what Burg ultimately rejected. Burg requested the baptism once in 1824, but then he postponed his request "because of family relationships" on 16 November 1824.

On 6 December 1830 Burg had to learn, that the King did not even want to appoint him to the rank of a captain of the army, because he had not attained "the salvation of the Christian faith". Burg's accomplishments in the service and the fact that he was a well-known book author and a respected military educator (Note: One of his students was the artillery officer and inventor Werner von Siemens.) were not taken into consideration. Since it simply came down to discrimination based on his belief, Burg considered quitting the army. Completely unforeseen, he was finally promoted to the rank of a captain of the artillery, on time and according to his seniority. (Note: Promotion on 11 Nov 1832.) He could not, however, wear the uniform of the artillery, but only the uniform of an armory captain (German: Zeugkapitän), a special branch in the Prussian army that ranked at the bottom. (Note: The armory uniform indicated that he did not lead troops.)

== Officer in the Pre-March Era ==
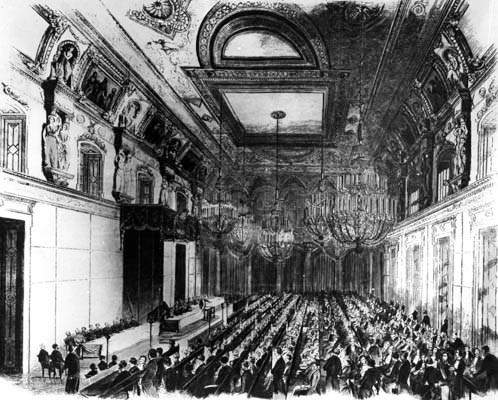
Zweiter Vereinigter Landtag (Second Prussian Parliament) in 1848

In the Pre-March Era it needed a new chief of the artillery, Prince Adalbert of Prussia, and a new king Frederick William IV to remove the injustice of the discriminatory Waffenfarbe (German for: "corps [or troop-function] color"). Through a cabinet order of 16 April 1844, Burg was allowed to replace the black epaulettes of the armory with the red epaulettes of the artillery. (Note: Burg describes that Prince Adalbert perceived the black epaulettes of the armory captain "almost as a badge".)

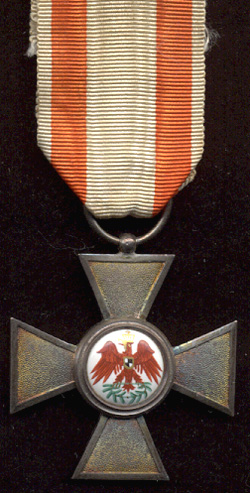
Order of the Red Eagle IV. Class

That was not the end of the discrimination. As the rank and quarter lists of the Prussian Army show, Burg was passed over by others who had entered the service after him. On 27 March 1847, Burg was granted the "character of a Major in the artillery" (German: Charakter als Major der Artillerie). That was actually not a real promotion. His uniform showed to the outside that he was a major, but in reality he did not serve on an established post of a major. He did not receive the salary of a major and he was not "in line" for another promotion. (Note: Rieger is the only author who clearly identified this final discrimination.) That was the end of his military career. The grounds given, that Burg's post would have exceeded the budget for a field officer is not convincing. There were always two to three younger majors on fully paid positions at the school, younger officers without Burg's merits. The political circumstances did not allow Jews to enter into the Prussian government positions or to get promoted if they had already a government position. A typical example is what Otto von Bismarck said on 15 June 1847 in the Vereinigten Landtag (Prussian Parliament). He said that he would "give the Jews all rights, but not to hold positions of authority in a Christian State"; if he had to obey a Jew, he would feel "deeply depressed and knuckled down".

Burg had to endure similar experiences when it came to the award of military medals. Although he had been recommended since 1838 by the commander of the United Artillery and Engineer School for the Order of the Red Eagle (German: Roter Adlerorden) Class IV, (Note: The Medal of the Red Eagle was the second highest Prussian medal.) it took more than three years until the medal was finally awarded to him by king Frederick William IV. (Note: Day of the award 15 Oct 1841. Burg did not receive the iron cross as falsely claimed by) The value of the medal can be explained with the fact that in the Artillery Brigade, which Burg belonged to until his promotion to captain, had been – at the moment of the award of the medal to Burg – under eighteen captains only one who had the medal and among the eight captains at his school, where he worked as an instructor, Burg was the only one. It appears that the Prussian kings did not hesitate as much when it came to awarding civilian medals to Jews. Burg repeatedly received high civilian awards. (Note: On 28 Jan 1845 Burg was awarded the "Golden Medal of Science".)

== Devout Jew ==
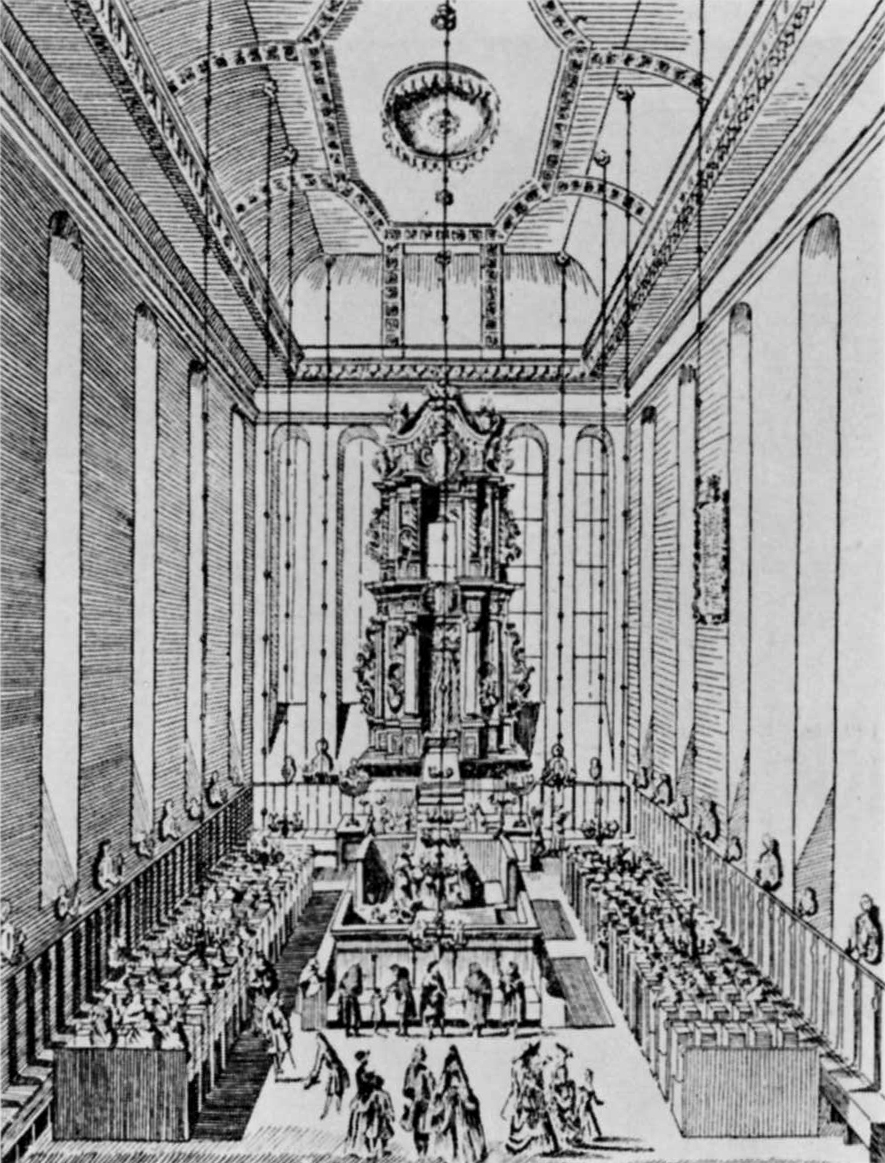
Synagogue on Heidereutergasse, then the main synagogue in Berlin (seen in 1725)

Burg was a devout Jew and participated actively in the Jewish community life. He served for many years on the board of the Kulturverein (cultural association) and on the board of the Auerbach orphanage. He was active on various committees in the Jewish congregation of Berlin and served for one year (1849–1850) as one of the elders on the board of the congregation. Burg resigned, when the board lost its legitimacy because it failed to comply with the General Concession for the Jews (German: General-Juden-Privileg) dated 17 April 1750 and when the board decided to file a complaint with the court. As a royal officer, Burg did not want to share "the insubordination against the government".

Burg tried to strictly separate between his government service and his religion. This proved to be nearly impossible, because both his government, which described itself as "Christian", as well as his congregation, who considered itself "orthodox", did not adhere to a strict separation between church and state. As a soldier, Burg was not able to strictly follow the Jewish ceremonial laws. That means that he had to disengage himself from a strict orthodoxy. In this respect, he is an example for a neo-orthodox, who felt that government service does not preclude the ceremonial law.

== Loyal monarchist Prussian ==
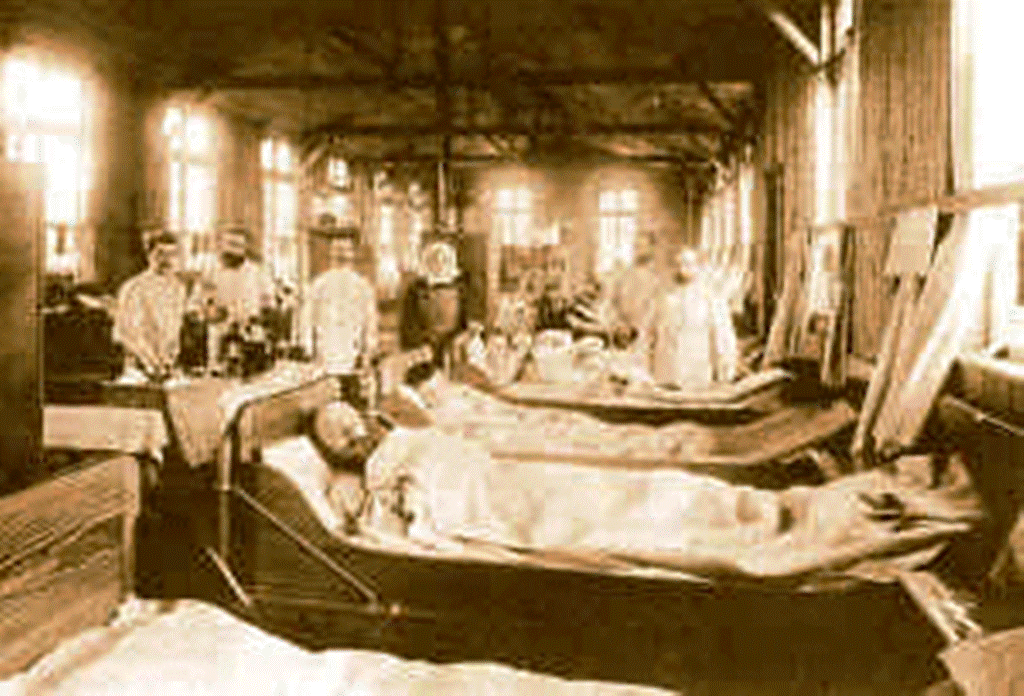
Cholera barrack

Burg described himself in his memoirs as a Prussian loyal to the crown and devoted to the king. Religiously he was rooted in Judaism. One did not exclude the other. (Note: Probably against Burg's will, his housemaid hid during the March Revolution one of the protesters – a son from a prominent Jewish family – in Burgs' own house.) He shared his political views and his patriotism with many in the educated German Jewish community, with whom he socially interacted, who wanted to assimilate into German society and who felt increasingly accepted.

During the years 1847 to 1849 Burg was engaged in writing his autobiography, which was published in 1854 in Berlin under the title Geschichte meines Dienstlebens ("history of my life in service").

In the March Revolution of 1848, Wolfgang Straßmann and eight further revolutionaries sought refuge in Burg's house at Berlin's Poststrasse when their barricades were attacked by Prussian troops on 18 March 1848. Except of Straßmann, who hid in the bed of one of Burg's servant girls, all of them were executed on the spot.

On 26 August 1853, Burg died as one of the first victims of the cholera epidemic. The funeral, which was conducted on 29 August with military honors, was a big event for the city of Berlin. The police estimated that about 60,000 people had gathered. (Note: Berlin had a population of about 440,000 at that time.)

== Publications ==
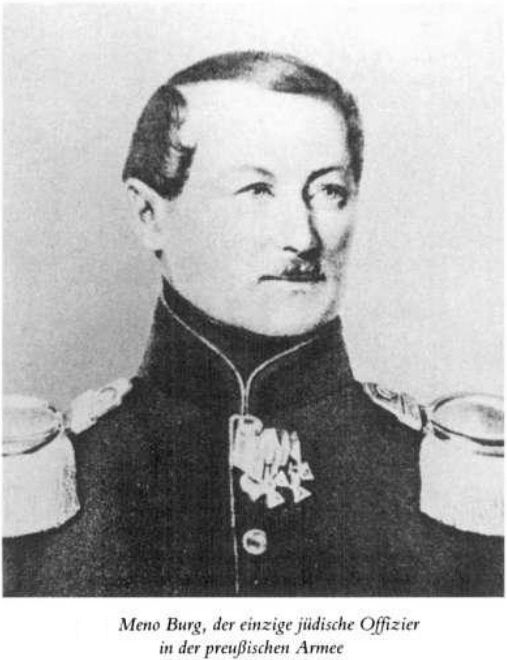
A slide of Meno Burg

- Burg, Meno (1822), Die geometrische Zeichnenkunst. Die allgemeine geometrische Zeichnungslehre. Das Zeichnen und Aufnehmen der Artillerie-Gegenstände I. Die allgemeine geometrische Zeichnungslehre; II. Das Zeichnen und Aufnehmen der Artillerie-Gegenstände, Berlin
- Burg, Meno (1824), Account of the Most Recent Improvements on the Lunar Tables
- Burg, Meno (1830), Das architektonische Zeichnen, oder vollständiger Unterricht in den beim Zeichnen der Architekturgegenstände und der Maschinen vorkommenden Constructionen; sowohl hinsichtlich der Anfertigung einer richtigen Linearzeichnung, als der Bestimmung der Schatten, Berlin
- Burg, Meno (1847), Traité du dessin géométrique, ou Exposition complète de l'art du dessin linéaire, Paris
- Burg, Meno (1848), Die geometrische Zeichnenkunst: Oder, vollständige Anweisung zum Linearzeichnen, zur Construction der Schatten und zum Tuschen für Künstler und Technologen, und zum Selbstunterricht; zunächst zum Gebrauche beim Unterricht in den Königlich preussischen Artillerie- Schulen, Berlin, p. 148
- Burg, Meno (1848), Traité du dessin et du levé du matériel d'artillerie, Paris
- Burg, Meno (1854), Geschichte meines Dienstlebens, Berlin
- Burg, Meno (1916), Geschichte meines Dienstlebens, ed. by Ludwig Geiger, Leipzig, p. 172
- Burg, Meno (1998), Geschichte meines Dienstlebens. Erinnerungen eines jüdischen Majors der preußischen Armee
