= JeAnne Burg =

American statistician

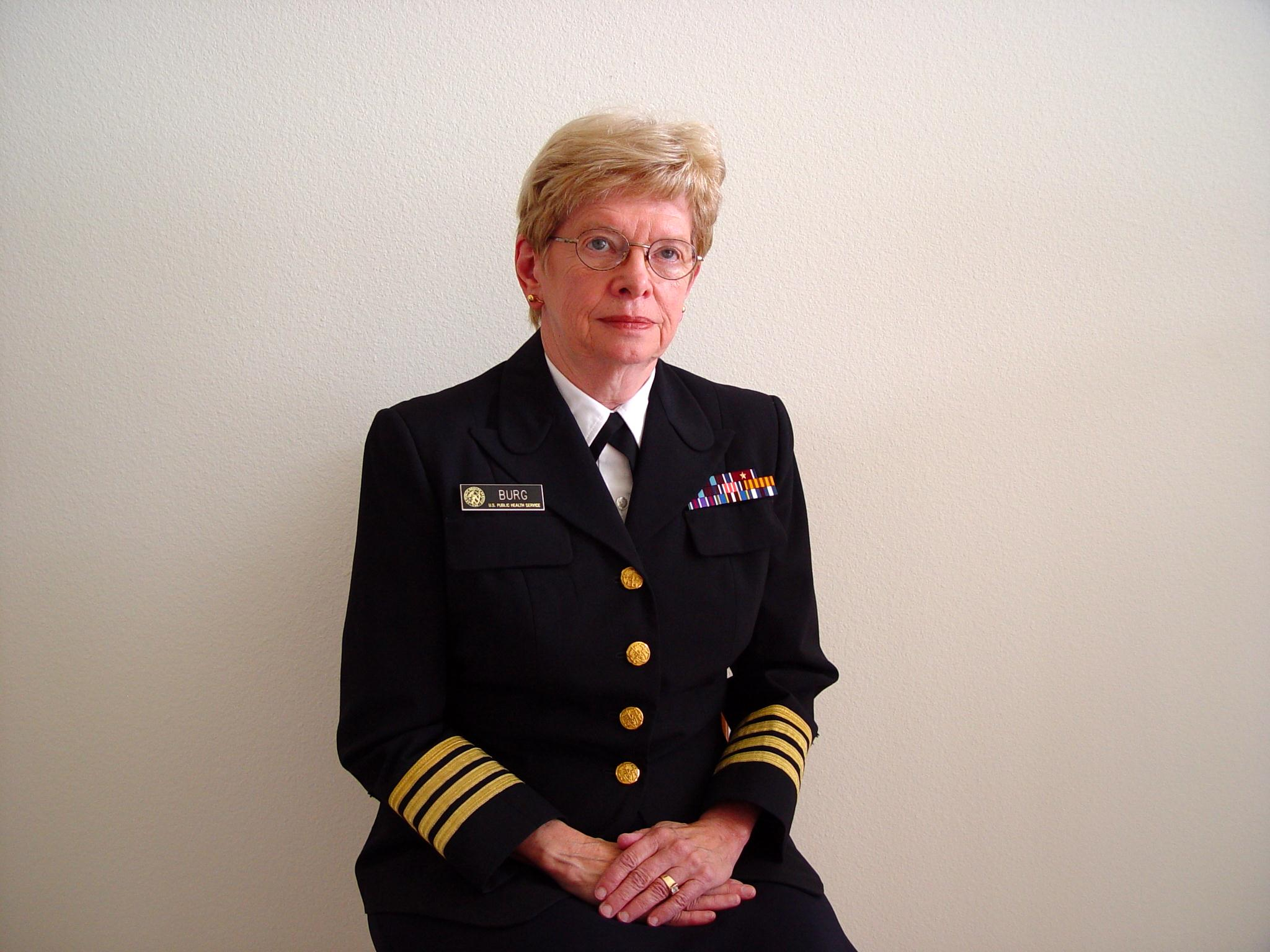
Dr. Burg in dress uniform.

JeAnne Rae Burg (December 23, 1937 – October 3, 2020) was an American environmental statistician who worked for many years in the United States Public Health Service.

== Early life and education ==
Burg was born on December 23, 1937, in Coleridge, Nebraska, one of three children in a farming family. She graduated at age 15 from high school and at age 19 from the Nebraska State Teachers College at Wayne. After a year as a high school mathematics and science teacher, she returned to school for a master's degree in chemistry at the University of Nebraska. She continued to teach at the high school level while her husband earned a Ph.D. in chemistry at Kent State University. After he took a faculty position at the University of Cincinnati, she earned a Ph.D. in environmental science there in 1975, while continuing to raise their two children.

== Career and later life ==
After completing her doctorate, Burg joined the United States Public Health Service, working for the National Institute for Occupational Safety and Health in Cincinnati. She later moved to the Agency for Toxic Substances and Disease Registry in Atlanta, Georgia and then to the Centers for Disease Control, where she retired in 2000 as a scientist and captain in the USPHS after 24 years of service.

After struggles with Parkinson's disease, she died on October 3, 2020, in Atlantic Beach, Florida.

== Recognition ==
In 1997, Burg was elected as a Fellow of the American Statistical Association.

== Selected publications ==
- Lynch, Dennis W.; Lewis, Trent R.; Moorman, William J.; Burg, JeAnne R.; Groth, David H.; Khan, Amir; Ackerman, Larry J.; Cockrell, Beverly Y. (October 1984), "Carcinogenic and toxicologic effects of inhaled ethylene oxide and propylene oxide in F344 rats", Toxicology and Applied Pharmacology, 76 (1): 69–84, doi:10.1016/0041-008x(84)90030-9
- Nelson, B. K.; Brightwell, W. Stephen; Mackenzie, Deborah R.; Khan, Amir; Burg, JeAnne R.; Weigel, Walter W.; Goad, Phillip T. (1985), "Teratological Assessment of Methanol and Ethanol at High Inhalation Levels in Rats", Toxicological Sciences, 5 (4): 727–736, doi:10.1093/toxsci/5.4.727
- Groth, David H.; Stettler, Lloyd E.; Burg, JeAnne R.; Busey, William M.; Grant, George C.; Wong, Lawrence (January 1986), "Carcinogenic effects of antimony trioxide and antimony ore concentrate in rats", Journal of Toxicology and Environmental Health, 18 (4): 607–626, doi:10.1080/15287398609530898
- Hardin, Bryan D.; Schuler, Ronald L.; Burg, JeAnne R.; Booth, Gary M.; Hazelden, Keith P.; MacKenzie, Karen M.; Piccirillo, Vincent J.; Smith, Kirby N. (1987), "Evaluation of 60 chemicals in a preliminary developmental toxicity test", Teratogenesis, Carcinogenesis, and Mutagenesis, 7 (1), Wiley: 29–48, doi:10.1002/tcm.1770070106
- Gist, Ginger L.; Burg, Je Anne R. (May 1995), "Trichloroethylene – a Review of the Literature From a Health Effects Perspective", Toxicology and Industrial Health, 11 (3): 253–307, doi:10.1177/074823379501100301
