= Wilhelm Loewenthal =

German-French physician (1850–1894)

Wolff Wilhelm Lowenthal
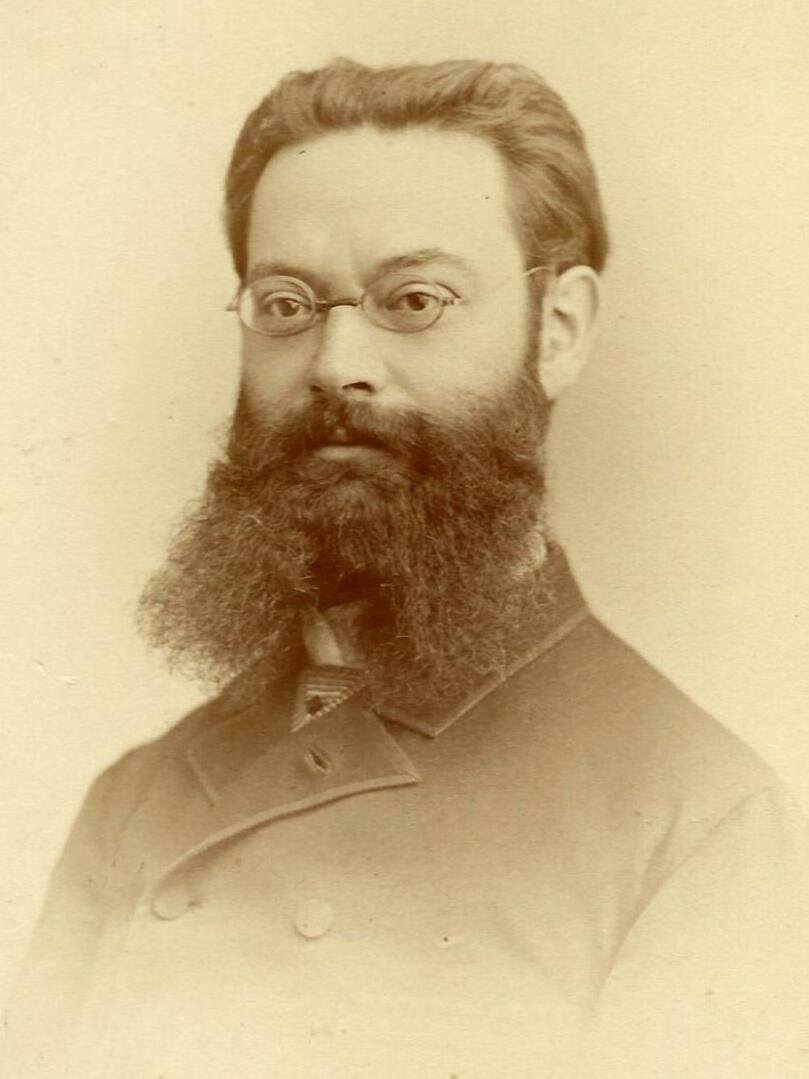
- Loewenthal in 1891
- Born: 15 February 1850; Rybnik, Silesia, Prussia
- Died: 22 April 1894 (aged 44); Berlin, German Empire

Wolff Wilhelm Lowenthal (15 February 1850 – 22 April 1894) was a Silesian-born, naturalized French doctor of medicine.

Lowenthal was born in Rybnik, Province of Silesia, now in Poland. He graduated from the University of Berlin, before travelling to the Caucasus to continue his medical research. At the same time, he was Professor at the University of Geneva at its campus in Lausanne, Switzerland.

He corresponded regularly with the Central Literary Bureau in Berlin. On 17 June 1878, he had an important audience with Victor Hugo, where he pledged himself to France as his home country to great public aclaim. This took place at the International Literary Congress of 1878, held at the Théâtre du Châtelet, in 1879.

After that meeting he met Georges Maillard. They met again many years later, when Maillard retranslated the first series of the Association Littéraire et Artistique Internationale.

== History ==
In 1879, he participated as a member of the Executive Office of the International Literary Congress in London, representing both French and other foreigners, under instruction from Jules Ferry, the Minister of Public Instruction. He was decorated as an Officer of the Academy.

In 1881, in Berlin, he and his brother Salo bought the publishing company Sozietät der Berliner Bürger-Zeitung W. & S. Loewenthal (formerly D. Collin), later known as Adressbuch-Verlag. In 1895, one year after his death, the publishing company was sold.

While owning the publishing company, he was the co-owner of the publishing and typography company Wilhelm and Salo Loewenthal in Berlin, which he founded with his brother.

He was a member of the Executive Committee of the Bureau of the International Literary and Artistic Association since its foundation in Paris in 1878 until 1889. Loewenthal took an active part in the conference which opened in Berne in 1883 to draft and vote on a draft "convention to establish a General Union for the Protection of the Rights of Authors in Literary and Manuscript Works", a conference whose work would lead to the International Convention of Berne in 1886.

He took part in research on cholera with Robert Koch, and continued work with Victor André Cornil in Paris. During this time two of his five daughters were born in Neuilly sur Seine: Hedwige, in 1883, and Suzanne, in 1886.

On 12 July, 1886, the Société d'Ethnographie à l’Hôtel de l'Alliance was reformed in Paris. There, Lowenthal was mentioned in dispatches to a packed house by the Journal Officiel from 9 August that year, in the following terms:

French: Monsieur le Docteur Wilhelm Loewenthal, ancien délégué général pour l'Allemagne, actuellement délégué correspondant à Lausanne (Suisse), fait une communication sur les connaissances actuelles de la science relativement aux microbes. Il présente un projet de classification de ces petits êtres qu’on considère tantôt comme des animaux, tantôt comme des végétaux, et décrit leur mode de reproduction. S’il est vrai que certains microbes sont causes des plus terribles maladies du genre humain, il en est aussi de bienfaisants pour l’homme, et sans lesquels il ne pourrait probablement pas exister., lit. 'Dr. Wilhelm Lowenthal, lately living in Germany, is actually writing to us from Lausanne, in Switzerland, about things he knows about the science of microbes. He has presented, to us, a project to classify these little beasts, which are neither as animal nor vegetable, and describes how they reproduce. If it is true that microbes are the cause of much human sickness, then the man does well to bring it to our attention, so that we can solve a problem that should not have existed.'

— Journal Officiel

In 1886, he received 16 certificates in medicine from the University of Heidelberg, equivalent to a French baccalaureat or roughly an English Bachelor of Science.

In 1887 he became a Doctor of Medicine, with his thesis entitled l'enseignement actuel de l'hygiène dans les facultés de médecine en Europe (Useful information on hygiene in medical establishments in Europe).

On June 6, 1889, without anyone knowing what followed, many French dailies – some under the title "the Loewenthal affair" – reported the granting by the Minister of the Navy to W. Loewenthal "pending French naturalization" of a "temporary commission as auxiliary doctor of the Navy, as a foreigner". This allowed him to go on a mission to Tonkin, at the request of the colonial administration, to experiment with “the immediate parasiticidal action of Salol on cholera microbes”. Loewenthal had previously tested its effects on himself by absorbing 10 grams daily, without any incidents other than dark-colored urine. After this in vitro experiment, he tried to cure guinea pigs and mice made cholera-prone by Koch's process.

In 1890, he went to Argentina, to organise the colony there. The colony was under the control of the Jewish Colonization Association (JCA), run by Baron Maurice de Hirsch. Hirsch had already corresponded with Salomon Hayum Goldschmidt, the president of the Alliance Israélite Universelle. They aimed to install Lowenthal as a rabbi in the colony, under Grand Rabbi Zadoc Kahn, in Paris. Differences of views between Loewenthal and Hirsch meant this never came about, and they agreed to separate in November 1891. It's understood from banking records that Lowenthal was in Berlin in 1891, then went to Brussels. A colony was established, called Moisés Ville, which was first colony of the JCA.

== Death ==
It has been proven by banking records that Lowenthal died at the age of 44 in Berlin, after leaving Brussels. His daughter Susanne was 8 years old, she is known to have survived The Holocaust.

== Children ==
- Käthe (1878–1942), Painter
- Gertraud
- Agnes
- Hedwig, (b. 1883 in Neuilly-sur-Seine)
- Susanne Ritscher, Painter, (b. 1886 in Neuilly sur Seine)

== Legacy ==
In the colony, the principal thoroughfare is named after Lowenthal.
