= George E. Burghard =

American philatelist

George E. Burghard (1895–1963) was an American philatelist who was added to the Roll of Distinguished Philatelists in 1963.
