= Burji =

Burji can refer to

- Burji dynasty, a dynasty that ruled Egypt from 1382 until 1517
- Burji people, an ethnic group in Ethiopia and Kenya
- Burji language, a language spoken in Ethiopia and Kenya
- Burji special woreda, an administrative subdivision of Ethiopia

== See also ==
- Bhurji (disambiguation)
- Burgi (disambiguation)
- Burgis (disambiguation)
- Burj (disambiguation)
