= Paolo Bürgi =

Swiss landscape architect

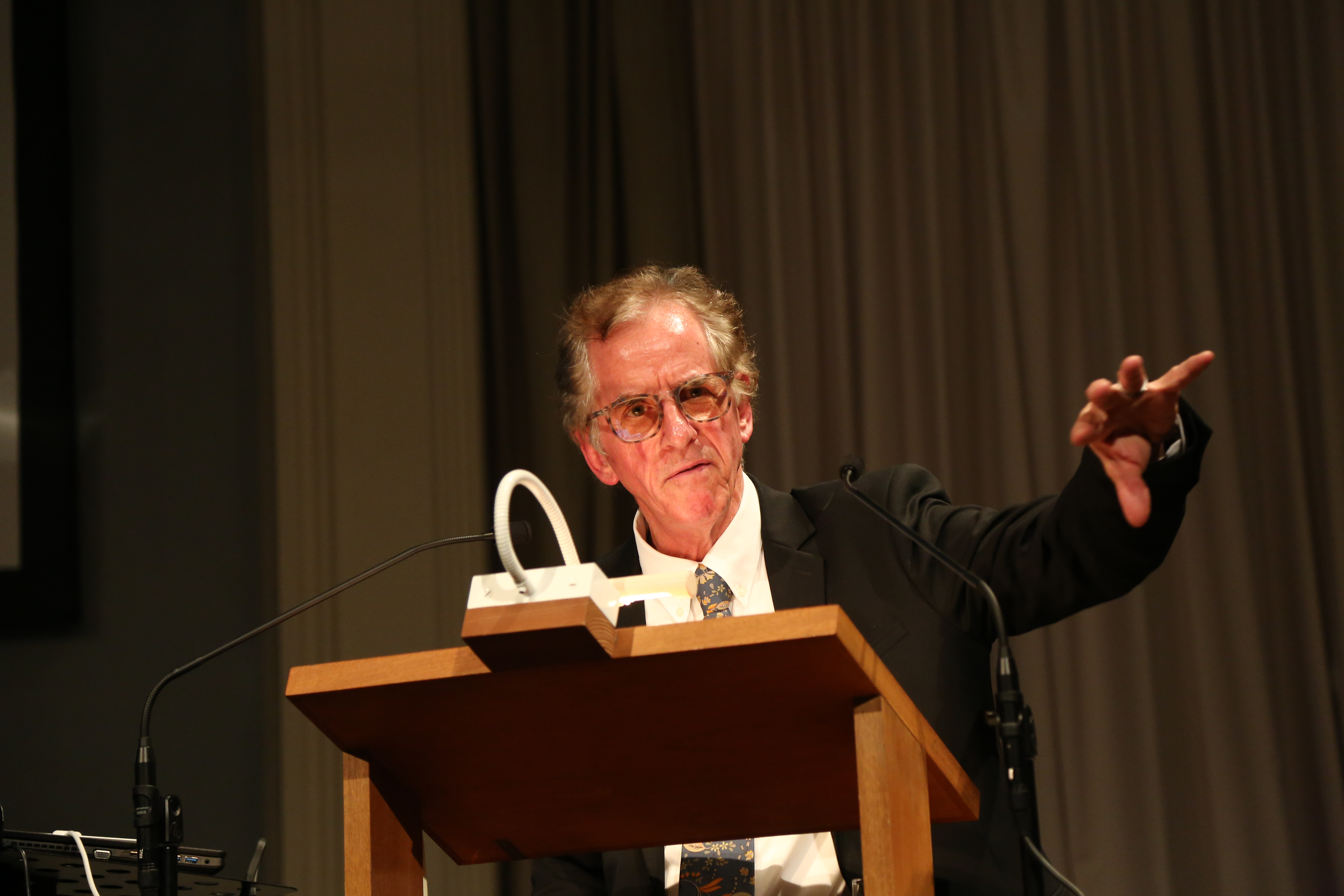
Paolo Bürgi, 2017

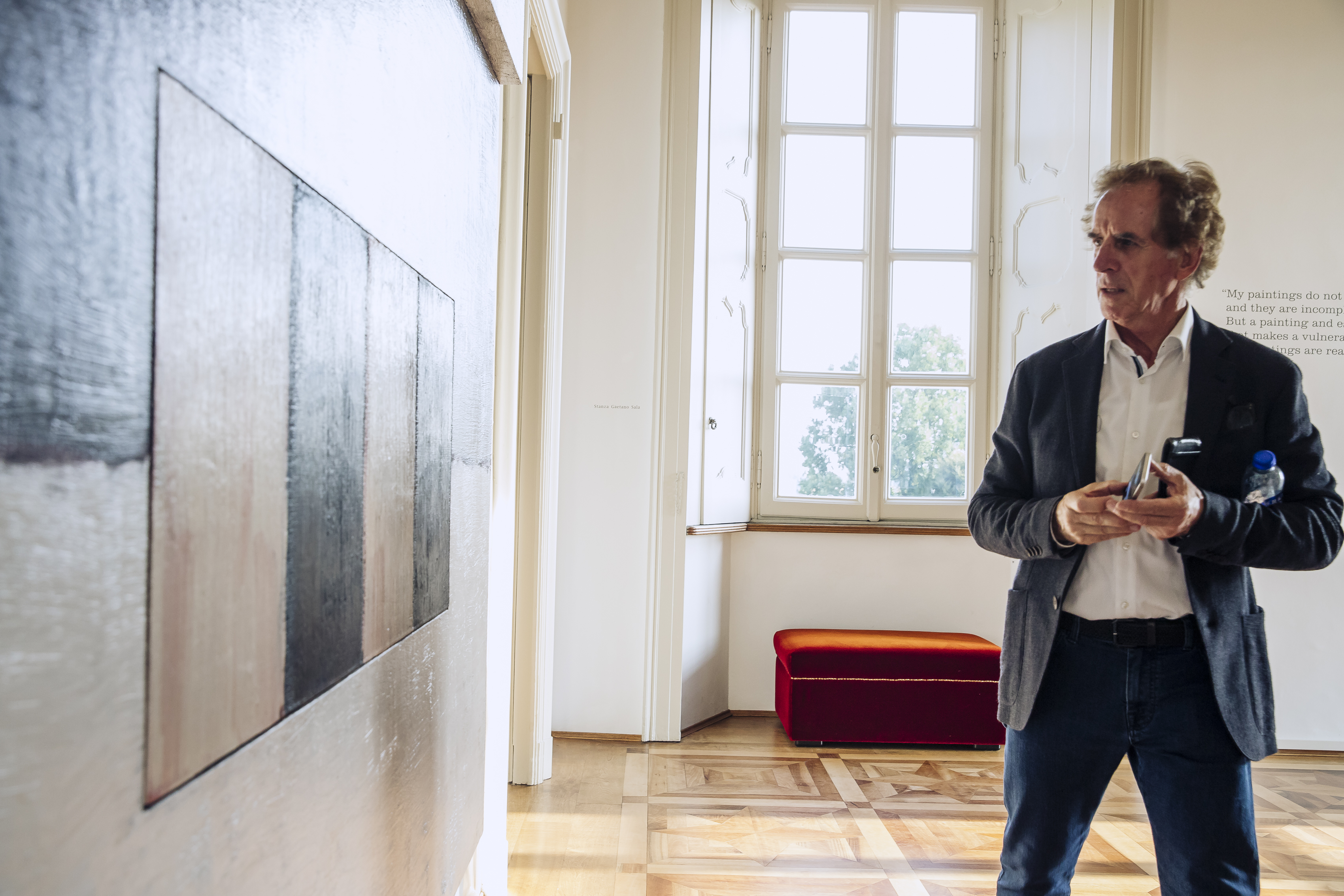
Paolo Bürgi, Thinking Varese, 2019

Paolo Bürgi (born 4 September 1947, in Muralto) is a Swiss landscape architect.

== Career ==
Paolo Bürgi graduated as a landscape architect from the Rapperswil School of Engineering (Hochschule für Technik Rapperswil) in 1975, winning first prize. His experience abroad has allowed him to get in touch with architect Luis Barragán, winner of Pritzker Prize in 1980. In 1977 he started his own practice and office of landscape architecture in Camorino, Switzerland.

He teaches at Politecnico di Milano since 2015 and since 1997 he is an adjunct professor at the University of Pennsylvania School of Design and at IUAV University of Venice since 2003.

He has been visiting professor at the Mediterranea University of Reggio Calabria and at the Knowlton School of Architecture in Columbus, Ohio.

His works focuses particularly on projects on the open space and in relation with architecture, in both the public and private fields, in Switzerland and abroad.

Paolo Bürgi is considered to be one of Europe's most acclaimed landscape architects. Particularly known for creating minimalist landscape interventions that powerfully reveal the essence of a place. Bürgi looks beyond a site's physical boundaries and takes into account its cultural and topographical history.

His work has been presented at several conferences and published in various countries, including: Europe, Korea, Chile, Argentina, China, Japan, Canada, United States.

== Selected projects ==
- Esplanade des Particules, a new entrance plaza for CERN, Geneva, Switzerland
- Cardada: Reconsidering a mountain, Cardada, Switzerland
- American Heart Institute, Nicosia, Cyprus
- Venustas et Utilitas – Urban Agriculture, Essen, Germany
- Bündner Kunstmuseum Chur - New Art Museum of Grisons, Chur, Switzerland
- Hafenplatz, Kreuzlingen, Switzerland
- Espace Auguste Piccard, Sierre Geronde, Switzerland
- Palazzo dei Congressi, Lugano, Switzerland
- Academy of Architecture – open space design, Mendrisio, Switzerland
- Motto Grande Quarry Park, Camorino, Switzerland
- OSC - Casvegno Park, Mendrisio, Switzerland
- Open-Air Museum on the Carso Goriziano, Gorizia, Italy

== Prizes and achievements ==
- 2019 "Premio per un giardinaggio evoluto", Orticolario
- 2019 "Die Besten 2019", CERN Esplanade des Particules, mention in the category "Landscape"
- 2018 "European Landscape Award", finalists' selection
- 2014 "Die Besten 2014", Il giardino delel unghe prospettive, mention in the category "Landscape"
- 2011 "Deutscher Landschaftsarchitektur Preis", mention for the project "Venustas et Utilitas, Zur neuen Ästhetik urbaner Landwirtschaft, Landschaftspark Mechtenberg"
- 2011 "Premio Internazionale Torsanlorenzo", for the project American Heart Institute in Cyprus
- 2003 "European Landscape Award" prize for the project Cardada, Reconsidering a mountain
- 2003 "Die Besten 03 - bronze" prize for the project Kreuzlingen Hafenplatz
- 1988 "Premio ASPAN" for the Motto Grande Quarry project in Camorino

== Bibliography (selection) ==
- John Dixon Hunt - Historical Ground - The role of history in contemporary landscape architecture, Routledge 2014
- Regionalverband Ruhr - Unter freiem Himmel - Under the Open Sky - Emscher Landschaftspark, 2013
- Xin Wu - Restoring Landscape Design as an Art, Conversations between Xin Wu and seven contemporary landscape designers from China, EU and US: 7 Paolo Bürgi - Between Design and Creative Interpretation, Beijing: Zhongguo jianzhu gongye chubanshe, 2012 (China Architecture % Building Press)
- John Dixon Hunt (transl. V. Morabito) - Sette lezioni sul paesaggio, 2012
- Massimo Venturi Ferriolo - Paesaggi: Sguardo dal Theatron, L'Orbicolare, 2007
- Michel Conan - Contemporary Garden Aesthetics, Creations and Interpretations, Dumbarton Oaks 2007
- Monika Suter, Peter Egli - Die schönsten Garten und Parks der Schweiz, 2006
- John Dixon Hunt - The Afterlife of Gardens, University of Pennsylvania Press - Reaktion Books LTD, 2004
- Michael Rohde, Rainer Schomann - Historic Gardens Today, Leipzig, 2004
- Solo con naturaleza (Catalogo de la III Bienal Europea de Paisaje III Premio Europeo de Paisaje Rosa Barba), 2003
- Claudia Cassatella, Francesca Bagliani - Creare Paesaggi, Realizzazioni, Teorie e Progetti in Europa, 2003
- John Dixon Hunt - Greater Perfections: The Practice of Garden Theory, 2000
