= Gustav von Burg =

Swiss teacher and naturalist (1871–1927)

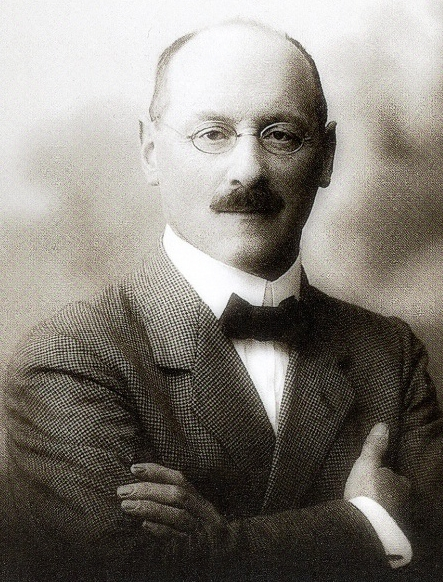
At around 50 years of age

Gustav von Burg (May 14, 1871 – April 16, 1927) was a Swiss teacher, writer, and naturalist. He worked as a district school teacher from 1897 to 1927 working mainly in Ölten. He was also involved in health insurance serving as a president of a company that his father had helped establish.

== Life and work ==
Gustav von Burg was born in Ölten, son of teacher-naturalist Jean (or Johann) von Burg (1840–1898) and Walburga née Husi. His father was from Bettlach and had taught at Wangen before moving to their home on Ziegelfeldstrasse in Ölten. The family had roots in an old bird catching family and Johann had founded a natural history museum in Ölten along with Adolf Christen in 1872 and was a well known teacher who was active in social circles. From an early age Gustav joined his father on outdoor trips collecting specimens of birds and small mammals. He too took an interest in keeping animals and birds. He trained as a teacher and received a license in 1890 and began to teach in Boningen. He went to the University of Naples (1894–95) where he studied Italian and to the University of Geneva (1895) where he studied French. He then taught in the canton of Solothurn and later Zofingen before moving to Ölten in 1897. In 1900 he married another teacher Ida Meier and they would have three daughters and a son. Their home on Ziegelfeldstrasse known as the "Haus von Burg" became a centre for bird research, and the headquarters of the "Federal Ornithological Commission in Ölten". He was a founding president of the Swiss Society for Ornithology and Bird Protection from 1909 but resigned from the position in 1913 when he was succeeded by Albert Hess. From 1902 he was involved, along with Theophil Studer, in producing a catalogue of the birds of Switzerland. He was also involved in the hunting community and edited the hunting magazines Diana (1907—1915) and Der Schweizerjäger (1916—1919). He collated hunting statistics and lobbied for the interests of hunters. He established a private hunting reserve of about 8 km^{2}. around Eptingen and Langenbruck. He also published a book on the plants of Switzerland for use in middle schools. He became a president of the health insurance company that his father had helped found and he supported a federal old-age and disability pension. In 1924 he was taken to court and his scientific credibility was questioned and although he was acquitted, he gave up contributing to scientific pursuits. He also wrote on political topics and he criticized the German Wehrmacht and their actions in Belgium during the First World War.
