= Bharbhunja (Muslim) =

Muslim community in India

Bharbhunja Muslim
Regions with significant populations
- India and Pakistan

Languages
- • Urdu • Hindi • Gujarati •

Religion
- Islam

Related ethnic groups
- Bharbhunja Hindu

The Bharbhunja are a Muslim community found in the states of Gujarat and Uttar Pradesh in India. In Uttar Pradesh, the community are also known as Bharbhunja Shaikh. The Bharbhunja Muslims are a section of the Bharbhunja Hindu caste.

== See also ==
- Bharbhunja Hindu
