= Paul Löwenthal =

Belgian economist and university professor (1936–2022)

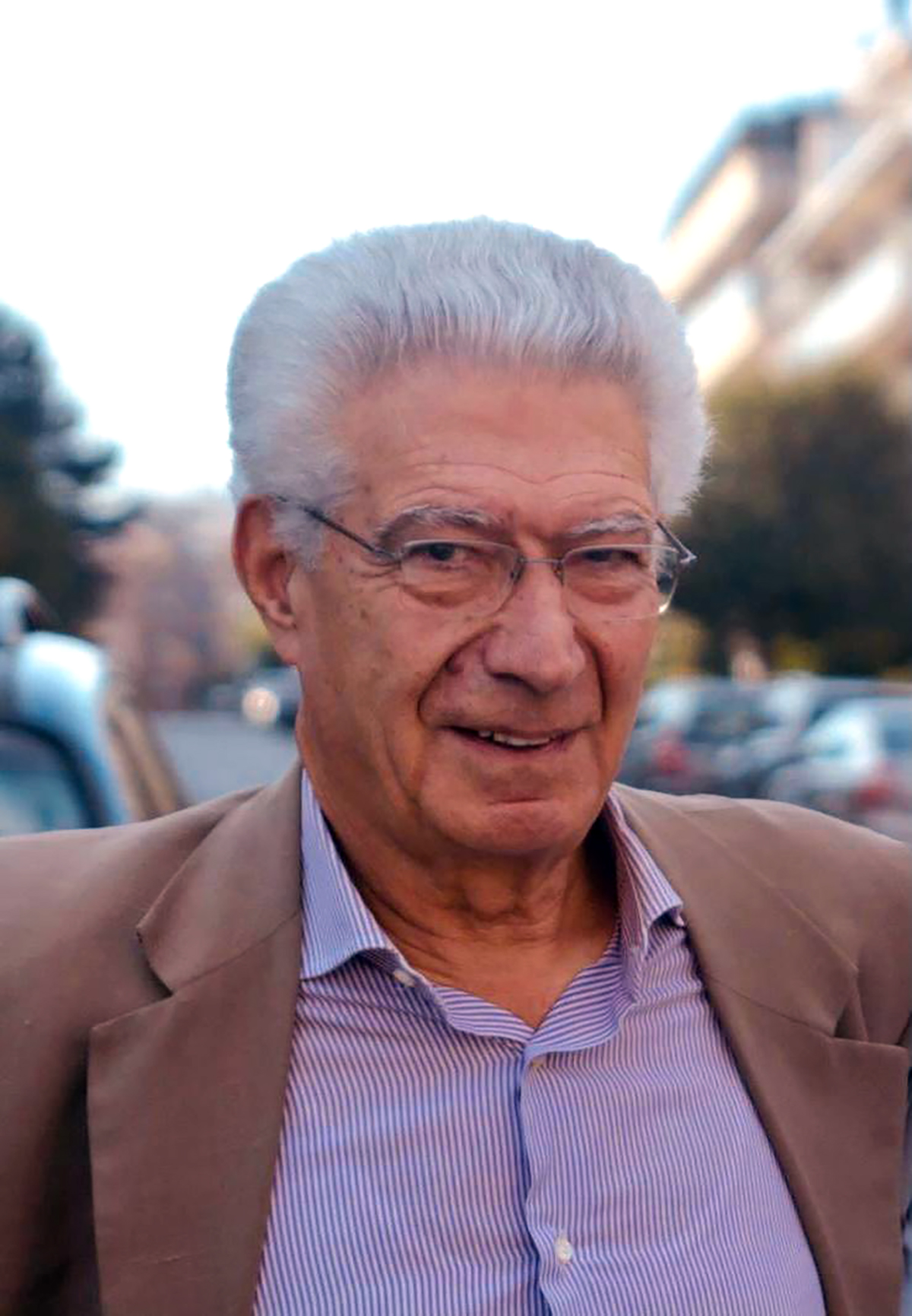
- Paul Löwenthal in 2022
- Born: September 1, 1936; Ghent, Belgium
- Died: February 8, 2022 (aged 85); Piétrebais, Belgium
- Occupations: Economist; University professor
- Employer(s): Université catholique de Louvain; Facultés universitaires catholiques de Mons
- Known for: Conjunctural analysis; economic policy; political philosophy
- Spouse(s): Maria (Mietje) Swinnen (romanist and psychologist)
- Children: Bernard Löwenthal; Xavier Löwenthal; Anne Löwenthal; Maiena Löwenthal; Serge Löwenthal

Paul Löwenthal (1 September 1936 – 8 February 2022) was a Belgian economist and professor at the Université catholique de Louvain (UCLouvain). His work focused primarily on conjunctural analysis, economic policy and public finance. Alongside his academic career, he was durably committed to the defence of human rights, notably within the Ligue des droits de l'homme and Amnesty International. From the 2000s onwards, he also published works on secularism, moral pluralism and democracy.

== Biography ==
=== Education and early career ===
Löwenthal was of German and Lithuanian Orthodox Jewish descent on his father's side and Flemish Catholic on his mother's side. He completed his secondary education with the Jesuits at the Collège Saint-Michel, Brussels, before studying economics at the Université catholique de Louvain, while working at the Banque de la Société Générale de Belgique (later Fortis).

=== Academic career ===
In 1963 he became a researcher at UCLouvain, and in 1970–71 a professor at both UCLouvain and the Facultés universitaires catholiques de Mons (FUCaM), where he taught conjunctural economics, economic policy and public finance.

He served as director of the Conjunctural Analysis Unit of the Institut de recherches économiques et sociales (IRES) at UCLouvain from 1970 to 1992. He published extensively in academic journals, notably in the Cahiers économiques de Bruxelles and in Recherches Économiques de Louvain (now the Louvain Economic Review, published by Cambridge University Press), and contributed to international institutional debates, including in the context of International Monetary Fund consultations. In 1981, he was a co-author, alongside Jacques Drèze, Fabrizio Padoa-Schioppa and other colleagues, of a major editorial on the Belgian economy in crisis published in the same review.

From 1989 onwards, he redirected his focus towards the coordination of economic policies, particularly regarding integration between unequally developed economies.

Between 1982 and 2006, he undertook inter-university cooperation missions in Latin America, principally in Uruguay, Chile and Peru.

He was appointed professor emeritus in 2001.

=== Political and institutional engagement ===
Löwenthal served as an adviser to Charles-Ferdinand Nothomb during his tenure as Belgian Minister of the Interior, a position from which he subsequently resigned. He was also associated with the Federal Planning Bureau, contributing to economic forecasting and analysis at national level.

=== Human rights engagement ===
Between 1995 and 2007, Löwenthal worked on economic and social human rights within the Ligue des droits de l'homme and Amnesty International in French-speaking Belgium. During his stays in Latin America, he collaborated with Amnesty International in collecting testimonies from political dissidents and prisoners, contributing to documentation of human rights violations in the region.

After his emeritation, he became involved in prison education. Through the association La Touline, which supports inmates pursuing higher education, he provided weekly remedial economics sessions at Nivelles Prison for detainees enrolled at university, combining academic content with discussion of current economic affairs.

=== Religious and secular engagement ===
As UCLouvain's representative to the Conseil interdiocésain des laïcs (CIL), the interdiocean council for lay Catholics in French-speaking Belgium, from 1996 to 2001, Löwenthal was elected its president, a position he held from 2001 to 2007. In this role, he engaged with questions relating to economic and social rights and the place of religion and philosophical conviction in the public sphere.

== Personal life ==
Löwenthal was married to Maria (Mietje) Swinnen, a romanist and psychologist of Belgian-Argentine nationality. They had five children: Bernard, Xavier Löwenthal, Anne Löwenthal, Maiena and Serge.

== Research ==
Löwenthal's work fell principally within applied macroeconomics, covering conjunctural analysis and forecasting, economic and budgetary policy, public finance, coordination of European economic policies, and the application of European budgetary standards to the Belgian case.

He published numerous articles in academic journals, notably in the Cahiers économiques de Bruxelles, and in Recherches Économiques de Louvain / Louvain Economic Review (published by Cambridge University Press), contributing to international institutional debates including in the context of International Monetary Fund consultations. In 2005 he published in the journal Mondes en développement an article on the relationship between civil society and political participation in the context of development cooperation. He also participated in institutional forums, including a conference organised by the Commission Justice et Paix in November 2008 on the economic crisis and the return of politics.

== Works on secularism and democracy ==
As emeritus professor from 2001, Löwenthal turned to political philosophy, focusing in particular on the place of religions and philosophical convictions within the secular state. He published several works on state secularism, moral pluralism, the relationship between law and conviction, and the foundations of democracy, extending his earlier reflections on public policy and the rule of law.

== Selected publications ==
=== Books ===
- Analyse conjoncturelle, De Boeck-Université, 1988.
- Une économie politique, De Boeck-Université, 1989.
- Économie et finances publiques, De Boeck-Université, 1993 (2nd ed. 1996).
- L'État laïque vu par un catholique, Labor, 2004.
- Un droit, des morales. Valoriser l'État laïque, P.I.E. Peter Lang, 2008.
- La liberté, pour quoi faire ?, Liber, 2011.
- Croiser les compétences, Liber, 2014.
- Réinventer des démocraties, Academia-L'Harmattan, 2017.
- De la transgression : les lois et la liberté, Academia-L'Harmattan, 2018.

=== Articles ===
- "Position et stratégie internationales de la Belgique dans la crise", Recherches Économiques de Louvain, vol. 47, 1981.
- "Conjonctures nationales et politiques européennes : quelles coordinations ?", Cahiers économiques de Bruxelles, pp. 95–104.
- "Société civile et participation politique. Le cas de la coopération au développement", Mondes en développement, 2005/1, no. 129, pp. 59–73.
- "Vers un pluralisme situé ?", contribution to the colloquium Université et convictions, UCLouvain.
- "Le travail, langue d'Ésope de l'économie ?", ARC, Analyse, October 2017.
- "Le pirate et le naufragé", Politique, 2017.

== See also ==
- Secularism in Belgium
