= Burghard =

Burghard is a German language surname. It stems from the male given name Burchard – and may refer to:

- George E. Burghard (1895–1963), American philatelist
- Günter Burghard (1942), Austrian ice hockey player
