= Bharbhunja (Hindu) =

Hindu caste found in North India and Maharashtra

Bharbhunja Hindu
Regions with significant populations
- • India • Nepal

Languages
- • Hindi

Religion
- • Hinduism 100%

Related ethnic groups
- • Bharbhunja Muslim • Kandu

The Bharbhunja are an occupational caste found in North India and Maharashtra. They are also known as Kalenra in Maharashtra. A small number are also found in the Terai region of Nepal.

== Origin ==
The Bharbhunja derive their name from the Hindi word bhun (Hindi: भुन), which means parch, and the Bharbhunja community was involved with the occupation of parching grain.

The Bharbhunja were said to have originally belonged to the Agarwal caste, but split off from them when they took to parching grain. There is no intermarriage between the two communities now. The majority of the Bharbhunja are Hindu, except a section in Gujarat and Uttar Pradesh, who form a separate community of Muslim Bharbhunja. A small number reside in Punjab and Haryana. Those in Haryana and Punjab speak Punjabi.

In Maharashtra, there are three distinct communities of the Bharbhunja, the Bhad Bhunjari, the Pardeshi Bhunjari and the Bhoi Bhunjari. All the three groups claim their origin from different regions, with Bhad Bhunjari claiming their origin from Gujarat, the Pardeshi from Madhya Pradesh, and the Bhoi from Rajasthan. Each of these groups is endogamous, and do not intermarry. They are also separated by language, with the Bhad Bhunjari still speaking Gujarati, while the other groups speak Marathi. The Bharbhunja are now found mainly in the districts of Nasik, Pune, Thane, Ahmednagar and the city of Mumbai.

== Present circumstances ==
The traditional work of the Bharbhunja is the parching and selling of parched grain. Like other occupational castes, the community has seen a decline in their traditional occupation. A majority of the community are now wage labourers, with a small number being small businessmen and some have become engineers, doctors, and some are now well settled in abroad. However, the decline in their traditional occupation has not seen a weakening of their identity. The community remains endogamous, and practices clan exogamy. Furthermore, there is no intermarriage between Sikh and Hindu Bharbhunja, and the two are now practically distinct communities.

The Maharashtra Bharbhunja are still involved in their traditional occupation of selling parched grain. A significant numbers are now businessmen, and they were one of the few artisan castes to have made the change over to modern economy fairly successfully. A few of their clans are the Parmar, Powar, Parotia, Jadhav, Shinde and Chowhan, which are also used as surnames.

== Uttar Pradesh ==
In Uttar Pradesh, the Bhabhunja are referred to as the Bhurji. They are still involved in their traditional occupation of grain parching. Wages of the parcher is fixed in terms of the proportion of grain that is parched. They purchase the grain from agrarian castes such as the Kurmi. The Bhurji live in multi-caste villages, often occupying their own quarters.

The deities of the Hindu Bharbhunja include Panchon Pir and Baram Baba. They are found throughout Uttar Pradesh, but their place is taken by the Kandu in eastern Uttar Pradesh, another caste traditionally associated with grain parching. The community speak the Kauravi dialect in the west, and Bhojpuri in the east.
