= Elisabeth Büchsel =

German painter, 1867–1957

- Born: 29 January 1867; Stralsund, Germany
- Died: 3 July 1957 (aged 90); Stralsund, Germany
- Known for: Painting

Elisabeth Büchsel (1867–1957) was a German painter known for her Impressionist portraits and landscapes.

== Biography ==
Büchsel was born on 29 January 1867 in Stralsund, Germany. She studied in Berlin, Paris, and Munich. Her teachers included Lucien Simon and Christian Landenberger. She spent summers on the island of Hiddensee. She was a member of Hiddensoer Künstlerinnenbund (Hiddensee Association of Artists), where her fellow members included Elisabeth Andrae, Käthe Loewenthal and Julie Wolfthorn. She died on 3 July 1957 in Stralsund.
