= Bollingen Foundation =

Educational foundation (1945 to 1968)

- Formation: 1945
- Headquarters: Princeton, New Jersey, United States
- Revenue: $102 (2015)
- Expenses: $68 (2015)

The Bollingen Foundation was an educational foundation set up along the lines of a university press in 1945. It was named after Bollingen Tower, Carl Jung's country home in Bollingen, Switzerland. Funding was provided by Paul Mellon and his wife Mary Conover Mellon. The Foundation became inactive in 1968, and its publications were later re-issued by Princeton University Press.

== History ==
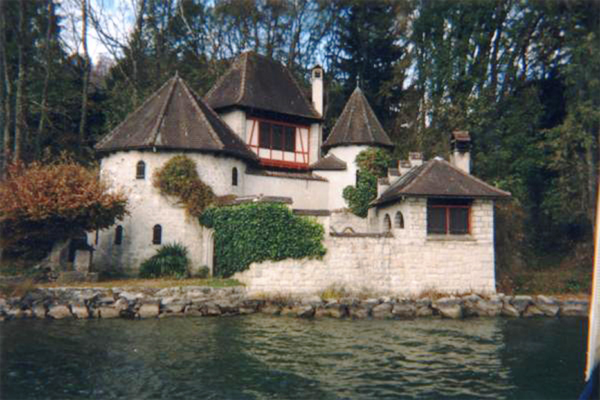
The foundation was named after Bollingen Tower (pictured), Switzerland.

Initially the foundation was dedicated to the dissemination of Jung's work, which was a particular interest of Mary Conover Mellon. The Bollingen Series of books that it sponsored now includes more than 250 related volumes. The Bollingen Foundation also awarded more than 300 fellowships. These fellowships were an important, continuing source of funding for poets like Alexis Leger and Marianne Moore, scholars like Károly Kerényi and Mircea Eliade, artists like Isamu Noguchi, among many others. The Foundation also sponsored the A. W. Mellon lectures at the National Gallery of Art.

In 1948, the foundation donated $10,000 to the Library of Congress to be used toward a $1,000 Bollingen Prize for the best poetry each year. The Library of Congress fellows, who in that year included T. S. Eliot, W. H. Auden and Conrad Aiken, gave the 1949 prize to Ezra Pound for his 1948 Pisan Cantos. Their choice was highly controversial, in particular because of Pound's fascist and anti-Semitic politics. Following the publication of two highly negative articles by Robert Hillyer in the Saturday Review of Literature, the United States Congress passed a resolution that effectively discontinued the involvement of the Library of Congress with the prize. The remaining funds were returned to the Foundation. In 1950, the Bollingen Prize was continued under the auspices of the Yale University Library, which awarded the 1950 prize to Wallace Stevens.

In 1968, the Foundation became inactive. It was largely subsumed into the Andrew W. Mellon Foundation, which continued funding of the Bollingen Prize. The Bollingen Series was given to Princeton University Press to carry on and complete. Over its lifetime, the Bollingen Foundation had expended about $20 million. Thomas Bender has written,

When Paul Mellon decided in 1963 to dissolve the Bollingen Foundation, he said that the founding generation was reaching the age of retirement, and it would be hard for others to maintain the original mission and standards. What he might have said was that the Bollingen Foundation was the work of a single generation. For two decades its concerns had been at the center of Western intellectual life, but the 1960s saw a shift in the cultural preoccupations and critical concerns of intellect in the United States and Europe.

== Bollingen Series ==
A great many texts that were issued in the original Pantheon Books version of the Bollingen Series and in early editions by Princeton University Press are now out of print. The Princeton Press site does not provide a comprehensive list, and is missing some of the key texts in the series and some of the grandest in vision, e.g. the Egyptian Religious Texts and Representations series. A list of the works in the series, complete to 1982, appears as an appendix to William McGuire's book, pp. 295–309. The list below is based on McGuire's list and information appearing in the individual volumes, with help from the Princeton site and from The Library Congress Online Catalog.

=== Numbers 1 to 34 ===
Title	Volume Title	Author(s)	Translator(s)	Editor(s)	ISBN	Year	Bollingen Series No.
Where the Two Came to Their Father: A Navaho War Ceremonial		Jeff King, Maud Oakes and Joseph Campbell				1943, 1969	1
The Devil's Share		Denis de Rougemont	Haakon Chevalier			1944, 1945	2
The Timæus and the Critias or Atlanticus		Plato	Thomas Taylor			1944	3
Prehistoric Cave Paintings		Max Raphael	Norbert Guterman			1945	4
The Road of Life and Death: A Ritual Drama of the American Indians		Paul Radin				1945	5
Myths and Symbols of Indian Art and Civilization		Heinrich Zimmer		Joseph Campbell	069109800X	1946	6
The Symbolic Goldfinch: Its History and Significance in European Devotional Art		Herbert Friedmann				1946	7
Prehistoric Pottery and Civilization in Egypt		Max Raphael	Norbert Guterman			1947	8
On the Iliad		Rachel Bespaloff	Mary McCarthy		0691098069	1947	9
Psychic Energy: Its Source and Goal		M. Esther Harding		Foreword: C. G. Jung		1947, 1963	10
The King and the Corpse: Tales of the Soul's Conquest of Evil		Heinrich Zimmer		Joseph Campbell	0691097798	1948, 1956	11
The Limits of Art: Poetry and Prose Chosen by Ancient and Modern Critics		an anthology		Huntington Cairns		1948	12
Egyptian Servant Statues		James H. Breasted Jr.				1948	13
Corpus of Ancient Near Eastern Seals in North American Collections	The Collection of the Pierpont Morgan Library, in 2 parts			Edith Porada, Briggs Buchanan		1948	14:1
Corpus of Ancient Near Eastern Seals in North American Collections	Stamp Seals and Finger Rings					none	14:2
Exile and Other Poems		St.-John Perse	Denis Devlin			1949, 1953	15
Lectures in Criticism		multiple		Introduction: Huntington Cairns		1949	16
The Hero with a Thousand Faces		Joseph Campbell				1949, 1968	17
Navaho Religion: A Study of Symbolism		Gladys A. Reichard		2nd ed. foreword: Oliver La Farge	0691098018	1950, 1963	18
The I Ching, or Book of Changes			Richard Wilhelm into German, Cary F. Baynes into English	Foreword: C. G. Jung; 3rd edition preface: Hellmut Wilhelm	069109750X	1950, 1961, 1967	19:1
Lectures on the I Ching: Constancy and Change		Richard Wilhelm	Irene Eber			1979	19:2
The Collected Works of C. G. Jung	Volume 1. Psychiatric Studies	C. G. Jung	R. F. C. Hull		0691097682	1957, 1970	20:1
The Collected Works of C. G. Jung	Volume 2. Experimental Researches	C. G. Jung	Leopold Stein, Diana Riviere		069109764X	1973	20:2
The Collected Works of C. G. Jung	Volume 3. The Psychogenesis of Mental Disease	C. G. Jung	R. F. C. Hull		0691097690	1960	20:3
The Collected Works of C. G. Jung	Volume 4. Freud and Psychoanalysis	C. G. Jung	R. F. C. Hull		0691097658	1961	20:4
The Collected Works of C. G. Jung	Volume 5. Symbols of Transformation	C. G. Jung	R. F. C. Hull			1956, 1967	20:5
The Collected Works of C. G. Jung	Volume 6. Psychological Types	C. G. Jung	R. F. C. Hull, H. C. Baynes		0691097704	1971	20:6
The Collected Works of C. G. Jung	Volume 7. Two Essays on Analytical Psychology	C. G. Jung	R. F. C. Hull			1953, 1966	20:7
The Collected Works of C. G. Jung	Volume 8. The Structure and Dynamics of the Psyche	C. G. Jung	R. F. C. Hull		0691097747	1960, 1969	20:8
The Collected Works of C. G. Jung	Volume 9, Part 1 – The Archetypes and the Collective Unconscious	C. G. Jung	R. F. C. Hull			1959, 1968	20:9.1
The Collected Works of C. G. Jung	Volume 9, Part 2 – Aion: Researches into the Phenomenology of the Self	C. G. Jung	R. F. C. Hull		0691097593	1959, 1968	20:9.2
The Collected Works of C. G. Jung	Volume 10. Civilization in Transition	C. G. Jung	R. F. C. Hull		0691097623	1964, 1970	20:10
The Collected Works of C. G. Jung	Volume 11. Psychology and Religion: West and East	C. G. Jung	R. F. C. Hull		0691097720	1958, 1969	20:11
The Collected Works of C. G. Jung	Volume 12. Psychology and Alchemy	C. G. Jung	R. F. C. Hull		0691097712	1953, 1968	20:12
The Collected Works of C. G. Jung	Volume 13. Alchemical Studies	C. G. Jung	R. F. C. Hull			1967	20:13
The Collected Works of C. G. Jung	Volume 14. Mysterium Coniunctionis: An Inquiry Into the Separation and Synthesis of Psychic Opposites in Alchemy	C. G. Jung	R. F. C. Hull		0691097666	1963, 1970	20:14
The Collected Works of C. G. Jung	Volume 15. The Spirit in Man, Art, and Literature	C. G. Jung	R. F. C. Hull			1966	20:15
The Collected Works of C. G. Jung	Volume 16. The Practice of Psychotherapy	C. G. Jung	R. F. C. Hull		0691097674	1954, 1966	20:16
The Collected Works of C. G. Jung	Volume 17. The Development of Personality	C. G. Jung	R. F. C. Hull		0691097631	1954	20:17
The Collected Works of C. G. Jung	Volume 18. The Symbolic Life. Miscellaneous Writings	C. G. Jung	R. F. C. Hull			1976	20:18
The Collected Works of C. G. Jung	Volume 19. General Bibliography of C. G. Jung's Writings	Lisa Ress			069109893X	1979	20:19
The Collected Works of C. G. Jung	Volume 20. General Index	Barbara Forryan and Janet M. Glover			0691098670	1979	20:20
The Collected Works of C. G. Jung	Supplementary Volume A – The Zofingia Lectures	C. G. Jung	Jan van Heurck	Introduction: Marie-Louise von Franz	0691098999	1983	20:A
Religion and the Cure of Souls in Jung's Psychology		Hans Schaer	R. F. C. Hull			1950	21
Essays on a Science of Mythology: The Myth of the Divine Child and the Mysteries of Eleusis		C. G. Jung and Carl Kerényi	R. F. C. Hull		0691098514	1949, 1959	22
The Hieroglyphics of Horapollo		Horapollo Niliacus	George Boas			1950	23
The Psychology of Art	Museum Without Walls	André Malraux	Stuart Gilbert			1949	24:1
The Psychology of Art	The Creative Act	André Malraux	Stuart Gilbert			1949	24:2
The Psychology of Art	The Twilight of the Absolute	André Malraux	Stuart Gilbert			1950	24:3
The Dream of Poliphilo		Mary Hottinger	Related and interpreted: Linda Fierz-David			1950	25
Philosophies of India		Heinrich Zimmer		Joseph Campbell		1951	26
The Two Crosses of Todos Santos: Survivals of Mayan Religious Ritual		Maud Oakes		Introduction: Paul Radin		1951	27
Paracelsus: Selected Writings		Paracelsus	Norbert Guterman	Jolande Jacobi, Foreword: C. G. Jung		1951, 1958	28
The Art of Letters: Lu Chi's "Wen Fu," A. D. 302		Lu Chi	E. R. Hughes	Forenote: I. A. Richards		1951	29
Papers from the Eranos Yearbooks	Spirit and Nature		Joseph Campbell, Olga Froebe-Kapteyn	Ralph Manheim		1954	30:1
Papers from the Eranos Yearbooks	The Mysteries		Joseph Campbell, Olga Froebe-Kapteyn	Ralph Manheim		1955	30:2
Papers from the Eranos Yearbooks	Man and Time		Joseph Campbell, Olga Froebe-Kapteyn	Ralph Manheim		1957	30:3
Papers from the Eranos Yearbooks	Spiritual Disciplines		Joseph Campbell, Olga Froebe-Kapteyn	Ralph Manheim		1960	30:4
Papers from the Eranos Yearbooks	Man and Transformation		Joseph Campbell, Olga Froebe-Kapteyn	Ralph Manheim		1964	30:5
Papers from the Eranos Yearbooks	The Mystic Vision		Joseph Campbell, Olga Froebe-Kapteyn	Ralph Manheim		1968	30:6
C. G. Jung: Psychological Reflections. A New Anthology of His Writings, 1905–1961		C. G. Jung	R.F.C. Hull	Jolande Jacobi and R.F.C. Hull	069109862X	1953, 1970	31
African Folktales and Sculpture				Paul Radin, Elinore Marvel, James Johnson Sweeney		1952, 1964	32
Selected Writings of Hugo von Hofmannsthal	Selected Prose	Hugo von Hofmannsthal	Mary Hottinger, Tania Stern, James Stern	Introduction: Hermann Broch		1952	33:1
Selected Writings of Hugo von Hofmannsthal	Poems and Verse Plays	Hugo von Hofmannsthal	multiple	Michael Hamburger, preface: T. S. Eliot		1961	33:2
Selected Writings of Hugo von Hofmannsthal	Selected Plays and Libretti	Hugo von Hofmannsthal	multiple	Michael Hamburger		1963	33:3
Winds		St.-John Perse	Hugh Chisholm			1953, 1961	34

=== Number 35: The A. W. Mellon Lectures in the Fine Arts ===
This is the only part of the Bollingen Series that continues to produce new volumes.

Title	Volume Title	Author(s)	Translator(s)	Editor(s)	ISBN	Year	Bollingen Series No.
The A. W. Mellon Lectures in the Fine Arts	Creative Intuition in Art and Poetry – 1952	Jacques Maritain			0691097895	1953	35:1
The A. W. Mellon Lectures in the Fine Arts	The Nude: A Study in Ideal Form – 1953	Kenneth Clark				1956	35:2
The A. W. Mellon Lectures in the Fine Arts	The Art of Sculpture – 1954	Herbert Read				1956, 1961	35:3
The A. W. Mellon Lectures in the Fine Arts	Painting and Reality – 1955	Etienne Gilson				1957, 1968	35:4
The A. W. Mellon Lectures in the Fine Arts	Art and Illusion: A Study in the Psychology of Pictorial Representation – 1956	E. H. Gombrich				1960, 1961	35:5
The A. W. Mellon Lectures in the Fine Arts	The Eternal Present: The Beginnings of Art – 1957	S. Giedion				1962	35:6.1
The A. W. Mellon Lectures in the Fine Arts	The Eternal Present: The Beginnings of Architecture – 1957	S. Giedion				1964	35:6.2
The A. W. Mellon Lectures in the Fine Arts	Nicolas Poussin – 1958, 2 volumes, boxed	Anthony Blunt				1967	35:7.1–2
The A. W. Mellon Lectures in the Fine Arts	Of Divers Arts – 1959	Naum Gabo				1962	35:8
The A. W. Mellon Lectures in the Fine Arts	Horace Walpole – 1960	Wilmarth Sheldon Lewis				1960	35:9
The A. W. Mellon Lectures in the Fine Arts	Christian Iconography: A Study of Its Origins – 1961	André Grabar				1968	35:10
The A. W. Mellon Lectures in the Fine Arts	Blake and Tradition – 1962, 2 volumes, boxed	Kathleen Raine				1968	35:11.1–2
The A. W. Mellon Lectures in the Fine Arts	The Portrait in the Renaissance – 1963	John Pope-Hennessy				1966	35:12
The A. W. Mellon Lectures in the Fine Arts	On Quality in Art: Criteria of Excellence, Past and Present – 1964	Jakob Rosenberg				1967	35:13
The A. W. Mellon Lectures in the Fine Arts	The Origins of Romanticism – 1965	Isaiah Berlin				see 35:45	[35:14]
The A. W. Mellon Lectures in the Fine Arts	Visionary and Dreamer, Two Poetic Painters: Samuel Palmer and Edward Burne-Jones – 1966	David Cecil				1969	35:15
The A. W. Mellon Lectures in the Fine Arts	Mnemosyne: The Parallel between Literature and the Visual Arts – 1967	Mario Praz			0691098573	1970	35:16
The A. W. Mellon Lectures in the Fine Arts	Imaginative Literature and Painting – 1968	Stephen Spender				none	[35:17]
The A. W. Mellon Lectures in the Fine Arts	Art as a Mode of Knowledge – 1969	Jacob Bronowski				MIT	[35:18]
The A. W. Mellon Lectures in the Fine Arts	A History of Building Types – 1970	Nikolaus Pevsner			0691099049	1976	35:19
The A. W. Mellon Lectures in the Fine Arts	Giorgio Vasari: The Man and the Book – 1971	T. S. R. Boase				1979	35:20
The A. W. Mellon Lectures in the Fine Arts	Leonardo da Vinci – 1972	Ludwig H. Heydenreich				none	[35:21]
The A. W. Mellon Lectures in the Fine Arts	The Use and Abuse of Art – 1973	Jacques Barzun			0691099030	1974	35:22
The A. W. Mellon Lectures in the Fine Arts	Nineteenth-Century Sculpture Reconsidered – 1974	H. W. Janson				Tulane	[35:23]
The A. W. Mellon Lectures in the Fine Arts	Music in Europe in the Year 1776–1975	H. C. Robbins Landon				none	[35:24]
The A. W. Mellon Lectures in the Fine Arts	Reflections on Classical Greek Art – 1976 (a.k.a. Aspects of Classical Art)	Peter von Blanckenhagen				none	[35:25]
The A. W. Mellon Lectures in the Fine Arts	The Sack of Rome, 1527–1977	André Chastel	Beth Archer		0691099472	1982	35:26
The A. W. Mellon Lectures in the Fine Arts	The Rare Art Traditions: The History of Art Collecting and Its Linked Phenomena Wherever These Have Appeared – 1978	Joseph Alsop			0060100915	1982	35:27
The A. W. Mellon Lectures in the Fine Arts	Cézanne and America: Dealers, Collectors, Artists and Critics, 1891–1921–1979	John Rewald, Frances Weitzenhoffer			069109960X	1989	35:28
The A. W. Mellon Lectures in the Fine Arts	Principles of Design in Ancient and Medieval Architecture – 1980	Peter Kidson				none	[35:29]
The A. W. Mellon Lectures in the Fine Arts	Palladian Architecture in England, 1615–1760–1981	John Harris				none	[35:30]
The A. W. Mellon Lectures in the Fine Arts	The Burden of Michelangelo's Painting – 1982	Leo Steinberg				none	[35:31]
The A. W. Mellon Lectures in the Fine Arts	The Shape of France – 1983	Vincent Scully				St. Martin's	[35:32]
The A. W. Mellon Lectures in the Fine Arts	Painting as an Art – 1984	Richard Wollheim			0691099642	1987	35:33
The A. W. Mellon Lectures in the Fine Arts	The Villa: Form and Ideology of Country Houses, 1985	James S. Ackerman				1990	35:34
The A. W. Mellon Lectures in the Fine Arts	Confessions of a Twentieth‑Century Composer – 1986	Lukas Foss				none	[35:35]
The A. W. Mellon Lectures in the Fine Arts	Imago Dei: The Byzantine Apologia for Icons – 1987	Jaroslav Pelikan				paperback 1990, 2011	35:36
The A. W. Mellon Lectures in the Fine Arts	Only Connect...: Art and the Spectator in the Italian Renaissance – 1988	John Shearman			0691099723	1992	35:37
The A. W. Mellon Lectures in the Fine Arts	The Mediation of Ornament – 1989	Oleg Grabar			0691040990	1992	35:38
The A. W. Mellon Lectures in the Fine Arts	Gold, Silver, and Bronze: Metal Sculpture of the Roman Baroque – 1990	Jennifer Montagu			0691027366	1996	35:39
The A. W. Mellon Lectures in the Fine Arts	Changing Faces: Art and Physiognomy through the Ages – 1991	Willibald Sauerländer				none	[35:40]
The A. W. Mellon Lectures in the Fine Arts	On the Laws of the Poetic Art – 1992	Anthony Hecht				1995	35:41
The A. W. Mellon Lectures in the Fine Arts	The Diffusion of Classical Art in Antiquity – 1993	John Boardman			0691036802	1994	35:42
The A. W. Mellon Lectures in the Fine Arts	Kings & Connoisseurs: Collecting Art in Seventeenth-Century Europe – 1994	Jonathan Brown			069104497X	1995	35:43
The A. W. Mellon Lectures in the Fine Arts	After the End of Art: Contemporary Art and the Pale of History – 1995	Arthur Danto			0691011737	1997	35:44
The A. W. Mellon Lectures in the Fine Arts	The Roots of Romanticism – 1965	Isaiah Berlin		Henry Hardy	0691007136	1999	35:45
The A. W. Mellon Lectures in the Fine Arts	From Drawing to Painting: Poussin, Watteau, Fragonard, David, and Ingres – 1996	Pierre Rosenberg			069100918X	2000	35:47
The A. W. Mellon Lectures in the Fine Arts	Paths to the Absolute: Mondrian, Malevich, Kandinsky, Pollock, Newman, Rothko, and Still – 1997	John Golding			0691048967	2000	35:48
The A. W. Mellon Lectures in the Fine Arts	Ten Thousand Things: Module and Mass Production in Chinese Art – 1998	Lothar Ledderose			0691006695	2000	35:46
The A. W. Mellon Lectures in the Fine Arts	Transitions – 1999	Carlo Bertelli				none	[35:49]
The A. W. Mellon Lectures in the Fine Arts	The Quarrel between the Ancients and the Moderns in the Arts, 1600–1715–2000	Marc Fumaroli				none	[35:50]
The A. W. Mellon Lectures in the Fine Arts	Giorgione and Caravaggio: Art as Revolution – 2001	Salvatore Settis				none	[35:?]
The A. W. Mellon Lectures in the Fine Arts	The Moment of Caravaggio – 2002	Michael Fried			0691147019	2010, audio version available on line	35:51
The A. W. Mellon Lectures in the Fine Arts	Pictures of Nothing: Abstract Art since Pollock – 2003	Kirk Varnedoe			069112678X	2006, audio version available on line	35:48?
The A. W. Mellon Lectures in the Fine Arts	More Than Meets the Eye – 2004	Irving Lavin				none	[35:52?]
The A. W. Mellon Lectures in the Fine Arts	"Great Work": Terms of Aesthetic Experience in Ancient Mesopotamia – 2005	Irene J. Winter				none	[35:53?]
The A. W. Mellon Lectures in the Fine Arts	Really Old Masters: Age, Infirmity, and Reinvention – 2006	Simon Schama				none	[35:54?]
The A. W. Mellon Lectures in the Fine Arts	Last Looks, Last Books: The Binocular Poetry of Death: Stevens, Plath, Lowell, Bishop, Merrill – 2007	Helen Vendler				2010, audio version available on line	35:56
The A. W. Mellon Lectures in the Fine Arts	Bosch and Bruegel: Parallel Worlds – 2008	Joseph Leo Koerner				none	[35–57]
The A. W. Mellon Lectures in the Fine Arts	Picasso and Truth: From Cubism to Guernica – 2009	T. J. Clark				2013, audio version available on line	35–58
The A. W. Mellon Lectures in the Fine Arts	Art and Representation in the Ancient New World – 2010	Mary Miller				none, audio version available on line	[35:59]
The A. W. Mellon Lectures in the Fine Arts	The Twelve Caesars: Images of Power from Ancient Rome to Salvador Dalí – 2011	Mary Beard				none, video version available on line	[35:60]
The A. W. Mellon Lectures in the Fine Arts	Chinese Painting and Its Audiences – 2012	Craig Clunas				none	[35:61]
The A. W. Mellon Lectures in the Fine Arts	Out of Site in Plain View: A History of Exhibiting Architecture since 1750–2013	Barry Bergdoll				none, audio version available on line	[35:62]
The A. W. Mellon Lectures in the Fine Arts	Past Belief: Visions of Early Christianity in Renaissance and Reformation Europe – 2014	Anthony Grafton				none, audio and video version available on line	[35:63]

=== Numbers 36 to 100 ===
Title	Volume Title	Author(s)	Translator(s)	Editor(s)	ISBN	Year	Bollingen Series No.	
European Literature and the Latin Middle Ages		Ernst Robert Curtius	Willard R. Trask			1953	36	
Jewish Symbols in the Greco-Roman Period	The Archaeological Evidence from Palestine	Erwin R. Goodenough				1953	37:1	
Jewish Symbols in the Greco-Roman Period	The Archaeological Evidence from the Diaspora	Erwin R. Goodenough				1953	37:2	
Jewish Symbols in the Greco-Roman Period	Illustrations. [Boxed with first two volumes.]	Erwin R. Goodenough				1953	37:3	
Jewish Symbols in the Greco-Roman Period	The Problem of Method. Symbols from Jewish Cult	Erwin R. Goodenough				1954	37:4	
Jewish Symbols in the Greco-Roman Period	Fish, Bread, and Wine – 1	Erwin R. Goodenough				1956	37:5	
Jewish Symbols in the Greco-Roman Period	Fish, Bread, and Wine – 2 (boxed with 1)	Erwin R. Goodenough				1956	37:6	
Jewish Symbols in the Greco-Roman Period	Pagan Symbols in Judaism – 1	Erwin R. Goodenough				1958	37:7	
Jewish Symbols in the Greco-Roman Period	Pagan Symbols in Judaism – 2	Erwin R. Goodenough				1958	37:8	
Jewish Symbols in the Greco-Roman Period	Symbolism in the Dura Synagogue – Text, 1	Erwin R. Goodenough				1964	37:9	
Jewish Symbols in the Greco-Roman Period	Symbolism in the Dura Synagogue – Text, 2	Erwin R. Goodenough				1964	37:10	
Jewish Symbols in the Greco-Roman Period	Symbolism in the Dura Synagogue – Illustrations [boxed with 2 text volumes]	Erwin R. Goodenough				1964	37:11	
Jewish Symbols in the Greco-Roman Period	Summary and Conclusions	Erwin R. Goodenough				1965	37:12	
Jewish Symbols in the Greco-Roman Period	Indexes and Maps	Erwin R. Goodenough		?		1968	37:13	
The Survival of the Pagan Gods: The Mythological Tradition and Its Place in Renaissance Humanism and Art		Jean Seznec	Barbara F. Sessions			1953	38	
The Art of Indian Asia: Its Mythology and Transformations	(2 volumes, text and plates, boxed)	Heinrich Zimmer		Joseph Campbell		1955	39:1–2	
Egyptian Religious Texts and Representations	The Tomb of Ramesses VI (boxed text and portfolio of plates)		Alexandre Piankoff	Natacha Rambova, photographs L. F. Husson		1954	40:1.1–2	
Egyptian Religious Texts and Representations	The Shrines of Tut-Ankh-Amon (boxed)		Alexandre Piankoff	Natacha Rambova		1955	40:2	
Egyptian Religious Texts and Representations	Mythological Papyri (boxed text and portfolio of plates)		Alexandre Piankoff	Natacha Rambova		1957	40:3.1–2	
Egyptian Religious Texts and Representations	The Litany of Re		Alexandre Piankoff			1964	40:4	
Egyptian Religious Texts and Representations	The Pyramid of Unas		Alexandre Piankoff			1968	40:5	
Egyptian Religious Texts and Representations	The Wandering of the Soul		Alexandre Piankoff	Helen Jacquet-Gordon		1974	40:6	
Chapman's Homer	The Iliad	Homer	George Chapman	Allardyce Nicoll		1956	41:1	
Chapman's Homer	The Odyssey and the Lesser Homerica	Homer	George Chapman	Allardyce Nicoll		1956	41:2	
The Origins and History of Consciousness		Erich Neumann	R. F. C. Hull	Foreword: C. G. Jung		1954	42	
The Muqaddimah: An Introduction to History. 3 volumes, boxed		Ibn Khaldûn	Franz Rosenthal	N.J. Dawood		1958, 1967	43:1–3	
Sound and Symbol	Music and the External World	Victor Zuckerkandl	Willard R. Trask			1956	44:1	
Sound and Symbol	Man the Musician	Victor Zuckerkandl	Norbert Guterman		0691099251	1973	44:2	
Collected Works of Paul Valéry	Poems	Paul Valéry	David Paul, James R. Lawler	Jackson Mathews	069109859X	1971	45:1	
Collected Works of Paul Valéry	Poems in the Rough	Paul Valéry	Hilary Corke	Jackson Mathews	069109845X	1969	45:2	
Collected Works of Paul Valéry	Plays	Paul Valéry	David Paul, Robert Fitzgerald	Jackson Mathews		1960	45:3	
Collected Works of Paul Valéry	Dialogues	Paul Valéry	William McCausland Stewart	Jackson Mathews		1956	45:4	
Collected Works of Paul Valéry	Idée Fixe	Paul Valéry	David Paul	Jackson Mathews		1965	45:5	
Collected Works of Paul Valéry	Monsieur Teste	Paul Valéry	Jackson Mathews	Jackson Mathews	0691099340	1973	45:6	
Collected Works of Paul Valéry	The Art of Poetry	Paul Valéry	Denise Folliot	Jackson Mathews		1958	45:7	
Collected Works of Paul Valéry	Leonardo, Poe, Mallarmé	Paul Valéry	Malcolm Cowley, James R. Lawler	Jackson Mathews	0691099359	1972	45:8	
Collected Works of Paul Valéry	Masters and Friends	Paul Valéry	Martin Turnell	Jackson Mathews		1968	45:9	
Collected Works of Paul Valéry	History and Politics	Paul Valéry	Denise Folliot, Jackson Mathews	Jackson Mathews		1962	45:10	
Collected Works of Paul Valéry	Occasions	Paul Valéry	Roger Shattuck, Frederick Brown	Jackson Mathews	0691098565	1970	45:11	
Collected Works of Paul Valéry	Degas, Manet, Morisot	Paul Valéry	David Paul	Jackson Mathews		1960	45:12	
Collected Works of Paul Valéry	Aesthetics	Paul Valéry	Ralph Manheim	Jackson Mathews		1964	45:13	
Collected Works of Paul Valéry	Analects	Paul Valéry	Stuart Gilbert	Jackson Mathews	0691098379	1970	45:14	
Collected Works of Paul Valéry	Moi	Paul Valéry	Marthiel Mathews, Jackson Mathews	Jackson Mathews	0691099367	1975	45:15	
The Myth of the Eternal Return: or, Cosmos and History		Mircea Eliade	Willard R. Trask			1954	46	
The Great Mother: An Analysis of the Archetype		Erich Neumann	Ralph Manheim			1955, 1963	47	
The Gothic Cathedral: Origins of Gothic Architecture and the Medieval Concept of Order.		Otto Von Simson		Appendix: Ernst Levy		1956, 1962	48	
The Tao of Painting: A Study of the Ritual Disposition of Chinese Painting	includes The Mustard Seed Garden Manual of Painting: A Facsimile of the 1887–1888 Shanghai Edition	Mai-mai Sze	Mai-mai Sze	Mai-mai Sze		1956, 1963, 1977	49	
The Notebooks of Samuel Taylor Coleridge	1794–1804	Samuel Taylor Coleridge		Kathleen Coburn		1957	50:1	
The Notebooks of Samuel Taylor Coleridge	1804–1808	Samuel Taylor Coleridge		Kathleen Coburn		1961	50:2	
The Notebooks of Samuel Taylor Coleridge	1808–1819	Samuel Taylor Coleridge		Kathleen Coburn	0691098042	1973	50:3	
The Notebooks of Samuel Taylor Coleridge	1819–1826	Samuel Taylor Coleridge		Kathleen Coburn, Merton Christensen	0691099065	1990	50:4	
The Notebooks of Samuel Taylor Coleridge	1827–1834	Samuel Taylor Coleridge		Kathleen Coburn, Anthony John Harding,		2002	50:5	
The Interpretation of Nature and the Psyche		C. G. Jung, Wolfgang Pauli	R. F. C. Hull, Priscilla Silz			1955	51	
Pandora's Box: The Changing Aspects of a Mythical Symbol		Dora Panofsky, Erwin Panofsky			0691098093	1956, 1962	52	
Beautyway: A Navaho Ceremonial. With Navaho text in pocket			Berard Haile	Leland C. Wyman, Contributors: Maud Oakes, Laura A. Armer, Franc J. Newcomb		1957	53	
Amor and Psyche: The Psychic Development of the Feminine, a Commentary on the Tale of Apuleius		Erich Neumann	Ralph Manheim			1956	54	
Éloges and Other Poems		St.-John Perse	Louise Varèse			1956	55	
Yoga: Immortality and Freedom		Mircea Eliade	Willard R. Trask			1958, 1969	56	
Complex/Archetype/Symbol in the Psychology of C. G. Jung		Jolande Jacobi	Ralph Manheim			1959	57	
Mudrā: A Study of Symbolic Gestures in Japanese Buddhist Sculpture		E. Dale Saunders				1960	58	
Plato	An Introduction	Paul Friedländer	Hans Meyerhoff		0691098123	1958, 1969	59:1	
Plato	The Dialogues: First Period	Paul Friedländer	Hans Meyerhoff			1964	59:2	
Plato	The Dialogues: Second and Third Periods	Paul Friedländer	Hans Meyerhoff		069109814X	1969	59:3	
Samothrace: Excavations Conducted by the Institute of Fine Arts, New York University	The Ancient Literary Sources		Naphtali Lewis	Karl Lehmann		1958	60:1	
Samothrace: Excavations Conducted by the Institute of Fine Arts, New York University	The Inscriptions on Stone	P. M. Fraser		Karl Lehmann		1960	60:2.1	
Samothrace: Excavations Conducted by the Institute of Fine Arts, New York University	The Inscriptions on Ceramics and Minor Objects	Karl Lehmann		Karl Lehmann		1960	60:2.2	
Samothrace: Excavations Conducted by the Institute of Fine Arts, New York University	The Hieron: Text 1	Phyllis Williams Lehmann		Karl Lehmann, Phyllis Williams Lehmann		1969	60:3.1	
Samothrace: Excavations Conducted by the Institute of Fine Arts, New York University	The Hieron: Text 2	Phyllis Williams Lehmann		Karl Lehmann, Phyllis Williams Lehmann		1969	60:3.2	
Samothrace: Excavations Conducted by the Institute of Fine Arts, New York University	The Hieron: Plates	Phyllis Williams Lehmann		Karl Lehmann, Phyllis Williams Lehmann		1969	60:3.3	
Samothrace: Excavations Conducted by the Institute of Fine Arts, New York University	The Hall of Votive Gifts	Karl Lehmann		Karl Lehmann, Phyllis Williams Lehmann		1962	60:4.1	
Samothrace: Excavations Conducted by the Institute of Fine Arts, New York University	The Altar Court	Karl Lehmann, Denys Spittle		Karl Lehmann, Phyllis Williams Lehmann		1964	60:4.2	
Samothrace: Excavations Conducted by the Institute of Fine Arts, New York University	The Temenos: Text	Phyllis Williams Lehmann, Denys Spittle		Karl Lehmann, Phyllis Williams Lehmann	0691099170	1982	60:5.1	
Samothrace: Excavations Conducted by the Institute of Fine Arts, New York University	The Temenos: Plates	Phyllis Williams Lehmann, Denys Spittle		Karl Lehmann, Phyllis Williams Lehmann		1982	60:5.2	
Samothrace: Excavations Conducted by the Institute of Fine Arts, New York University	The Anaktoron, the Sacristy, and the Early Strata Beneath the Arsinoeion and the Anaktoron			Karl Lehmann, Phyllis Williams Lehmann		No record of publication	60:6	
Samothrace: Excavations Conducted by the Institute of Fine Arts, New York University	The Rotunda of Arsinoe: Text	James R. McCredie		Karl Lehmann, Phyllis Williams Lehmann		1992	60:7.1	
Samothrace: Excavations Conducted by the Institute of Fine Arts, New York University	The Rotunda of Arsinoe: Plates	James R. McCredie		Karl Lehmann, Phyllis Williams Lehmann		1992	60:7.2	
Samothrace: Excavations Conducted by the Institute of Fine Arts, New York University	The Buildings of the Western Hill			Karl Lehmann, Phyllis Williams Lehmann		No record of publication	60:8	
Samothrace: Excavations Conducted by the Institute of Fine Arts, New York University	The Structures of the Eastern Hill			Karl Lehmann, Phyllis Williams Lehmann		No record of publication	60:9	
Samothrace: Excavations Conducted by the Institute of Fine Arts, New York University	The Propylon of Ptolemy II: Text	Alfred Frazer		Karl Lehmann, Phyllis Williams Lehmann	0691099227	1990	60:10.1	
Samothrace: Excavations Conducted by the Institute of Fine Arts, New York University	The Propylon of Ptolemy II: Plates	Alfred Frazer		Karl Lehmann, Phyllis Williams Lehmann	0691099227	1990	60:10.2	
Samothrace: Excavations Conducted by the Institute of Fine Arts, New York University	The Nekropoleis	Elsbeth B. Dusenbery		Karl Lehmann, Phyllis Williams Lehmann		1998	60:11	
Samothrace: Excavations Conducted by the Institute of Fine Arts, New York University	The History and Religion of the Sanctuary of the Great Gods			Karl Lehmann, Phyllis Williams Lehmann		No record of publication	60:12	
Essays of Erich Neumann	Art and the Creative Unconscious	Erich Neumann	Ralph Manheim			1959	61:1	
Essays of Erich Neumann	Creative Man	Erich Neumann	Eugene Rolfe		0691099448	1979	61:2	
Essays of Erich Neumann	The Place of Creation	Erich Neumann	multiple		0691099650	1989	61:3	
Essays of Erich Neumann	The Fear of the Feminine: And Other Essays on Feminine Psychology	Erich Neumann	multiple		0691034745	1994	61:4	
Change: Eight Lectures on the I Ching		Hellmut Wilhelm	Cary F. Baynes		0691097143	1960	62:1	
Researches on the I Ching		Iulian K. Shchutskii	William L. MacDonald, Tsuyoshi Hasegawa	Introduction: Gerald W. Swanson	0691099391	1979	62:2	
The living symbol; a case study in the process of individuation		Gerhard Adler				1961	63	
Zen and Japanese Culture		Daisetz T. Suzuki				1959	64	
Archetypal Images in Greek Religion	Prometheus: Archetypal Image of Human Existence	C. Kerényi	Ralph Manheim			1963	65:1	
Archetypal Images in Greek Religion	Dionysos: Archetypal Image of Indestructible Life	C. Kerényi	Ralph Manheim		0691098638	1976	65:2	
Archetypal Images in Greek Religion	Asklepios: Archetypal Image of the Physician's Existence	C. Kerényi	Ralph Manheim			1959	65:3	
Archetypal Images in Greek Religion	Eleusis: Archetypal Image of Mother and Daughter	C. Kerényi	Ralph Manheim			1959	65:4	
Archetypal Images in Greek Religion	Zeus and Hera: Archetypal Image of Father, Husband, and Wife	C. Kerényi	Christopher Holme		0691098646	1975	65:5	
Avicenna and the Visionary Recital		Henry Corbin	Willard R. Trask			1960	66	
Seamarks		St.-John Perse	Wallace Fowlie			1958	67	
The Archetypal World of Henry Moore		Erich Neumann	R. F. C. Hull			1959	68	
Chronique		St.-John Perse	Robert Fitzgerald			1961	69:1	
Song for an Equinox	St.-John Perse	Richard Howard			0691099383	1977	69:2	
The Kariye Djami [First 3 volumes boxed]	Historical Introduction and Description of the Mosaics and Frescoes	Paul A. Underwood				1966	70:1	
The Kariye Djami	The Mosaics/ Plates 1–334	Paul A. Underwood				1966	70:2	
The Kariye Djami	The Frescoes/ Plates 335–553	Paul A. Underwood				1966	70:3	
The Kariye Djami	Studies in the Art of the Kariye Djami	Paul A. Underwood et al.				1975	70:4	
The Collected Dialogues of Plato		Plato	multiple	Edith Hamilton, Huntington Cairns	0691097186	1961	71:1	
The Complete Works of Aristotle, The Revised Oxford Translation	Volume 1	Aristotle	multiple	Jonathan Barnes	0691099502	1984	71:2.1	
The Complete Works of Aristotle, The Revised Oxford Translation	Volume 2	Aristotle	multiple	Jonathan Barnes	0691099502	1984	71:2.2	
Eugene Onegin: A Novel in Verse	Introduction, Translation, Lexicon	Aleksander Pushkin	Vladimir Nabokov		0691097445	1964, 1975	72:1	
Eugene Onegin: A Novel in Verse	Commentary on Preliminaries and Chapters One to Five	Aleksander Pushkin	Vladimir Nabokov		0691097445	1964, 1975	72:2	
Eugene Onegin: A Novel in Verse	Commentary on Chapters Six to "Ten", Appendixes	Aleksander Pushkin	Vladimir Nabokov		0691097445	1964, 1975	72:3	
Eugene Onegin: A Novel in Verse	Index, Reproduction of 1837 Russian Text	Aleksander Pushkin	Vladimir Nabokov		0691097445	1964, 1975	72:4	
Hindu Polytheism		Alain Daniélou				1964	73	
Literary Language and Its Public in Late Latin Antiquity and in the Middle Ages		Erich Auerbach	Ralph Manheim			1965	74	
The Collected Works of Samuel Taylor Coleridge	Lectures 1795 On Politics and Religion	Samuel Taylor Coleridge		Lewis Patton, Peter Mann		1971	75:1	
The Collected Works of Samuel Taylor Coleridge	The Watchman	Samuel Taylor Coleridge		Lewis Patton		1970	75:2	
The Collected Works of Samuel Taylor Coleridge	Essays on His Times in The Morning Post and The Courier [3 volumes]	Samuel Taylor Coleridge		David V. Erdman	0691098719	1978	75:3.1–3	
The Collected Works of Samuel Taylor Coleridge	The Friend [2 volumes]	Samuel Taylor Coleridge		Barbara E. Rooke		1969	75:4.1–2	
The Collected Works of Samuel Taylor Coleridge	Lectures 1808–1819: On Literature [2 volumes]	Samuel Taylor Coleridge		Reginald A. Foakes	0691098727	1987	75:5.1–2	
The Collected Works of Samuel Taylor Coleridge	Lay Sermons	Samuel Taylor Coleridge		R. J. White		1972	75:6	
The Collected Works of Samuel Taylor Coleridge	Biographia literaria, or, Biographical sketches of my literary life and opinions [2 volumes]	Samuel Taylor Coleridge		James Engell, W. Jackson Bate	0691098743	1983	75:7.1–2	
The Collected Works of Samuel Taylor Coleridge	Lectures 1818–1819: On the History of Philosophy [2 volumes]	Samuel Taylor Coleridge		J. R. de J. Jackson	0691098751	2000	75:8.1-2	
The Collected Works of Samuel Taylor Coleridge	Aids to Reflection	Samuel Taylor Coleridge		John B. Beer	069109876X	1993	75:9	
The Collected Works of Samuel Taylor Coleridge	On the Constitution of the Church and State	Samuel Taylor Coleridge		John Colmer	0691098778	1976	75:10	
The Collected Works of Samuel Taylor Coleridge	Shorter works and fragments [2 volumes]	Samuel Taylor Coleridge		H. J. Jackson, J. R. de J. Jackson	0691098786	1995	75:11.1–2	
The Collected Works of Samuel Taylor Coleridge	Marginalia: Part 1. Abbt to Byfield	Samuel Taylor Coleridge		George Whalley	0691098794	1980	75:12.1	
The Collected Works of Samuel Taylor Coleridge	Marginalia: Part 2. Camden to Hutton	Samuel Taylor Coleridge		George Whalley	0691098891	1985	75:12.2	
The Collected Works of Samuel Taylor Coleridge	Marginalia: Part 3. Irving to Oxlee	Samuel Taylor Coleridge		George Whalley	0691099545	1992	75:12.3	
The Collected Works of Samuel Taylor Coleridge	Marginalia: Part 4. Pamphlets to Shakespeare	Samuel Taylor Coleridge		George Whalley	069109957X	1999	75:12.4	
The Collected Works of Samuel Taylor Coleridge	Marginalia: Part 5. Sherlock to Unidentified.	Samuel Taylor Coleridge		H. J. Jackson, George Whalley	0691099588	1999	75:12.5	
The Collected Works of Samuel Taylor Coleridge	Marginalia: Part 6. Valckenaer to Zwick	Samuel Taylor Coleridge		H. J. Jackson, George Whalley	0691004951	2001	75:12.6	
The Collected Works of Samuel Taylor Coleridge	Logic	Samuel Taylor Coleridge		J. R. de J. Jackson	0691098808	1981	75:13	
The Collected Works of Samuel Taylor Coleridge	Table Talk [2 volumes]	Samuel Taylor Coleridge		Carl Woodring, recorded by Henry Nelson Coleridge, John Taylor Coleridge	0691098816	1990	75:14.1–2	
The Collected Works of Samuel Taylor Coleridge	Opus Maximum	Samuel Taylor Coleridge		Thomas McFarland		2002	75:15	
The Collected Works of Samuel Taylor Coleridge	Poetical Works: Poems (reading text), in 2 parts	Samuel Taylor Coleridge		J. C. C. Mays	0691004838	2001	75:16.1(1–2)	
The Collected Works of Samuel Taylor Coleridge	Poetical Works: Poems (Variorum text), in 2 parts	Samuel Taylor Coleridge		J. C. C. Mays	0691004846	2001	75:16.2(1-2)	
The Collected Works of Samuel Taylor Coleridge	Poetical Works: Plays, in 2 parts	Samuel Taylor Coleridge		J. C. C. Mays	0691098832	2001	75:16.3(1–2)	
Shamanism: Archaic Techniques of Ecstasy		Mircea Eliade	Willard R. Trask		0691098271	1964	76	
Aurora Consurgens:		Attributed to Thomas Aquinas	R. F. C. Hull, A. S. B. Glover	Marie-Louise von Franz		1966	77	
The Demands of Art		Max Raphael	Norbert Guterman			1968	78	
The "I" and the "Not-I": A Study in the Development of Consciousness		M. Esther Harding				1965	79	
The Divine Comedy	Inferno. Italian Text and Translation	Dante Alighieri	Charles S. Singleton		0691098557	1970	80:1.1	
The Divine Comedy	Inferno. Commentary	Dante Alighieri	Charles S. Singleton		0691098557	1970	80:1.2	
The Divine Comedy	Purgatorio. Italian Text and Translation	Dante Alighieri	Charles S. Singleton		0691098875	1973	80:2.1	
The Divine Comedy	Purgatorio. Commentary	Dante Alighieri	Charles S. Singleton		0691098875	1973	80:2.2	
The Divine Comedy	Paradiso. Italian Text and Translation	Dante Alighieri	Charles S. Singleton		0691098883	1975	80:3.1	
The Divine Comedy	Paradiso. Commentary	Dante Alighieri	Charles S. Singleton		0691098883	1975	80:3.2	
Illuminated Manuscripts of the Divine Comedy	boxed set of text and plates	Peter Brieger, Millard Meiss, Charles S. Singleton				1969	81	
Birds. [boxed]		St.-John Perse	Robert Fitzgerald	color etchings: Georges Braque		1966	82	
The Inward Turn of Narrative		Erich Kahler	Richard Winston, Clara Winston	Foreword: Joseph Frank	0691098913	1973	83	
Myth, Religion, and Mother Right		Johann Jakob Bachofen	Ralph Manheim	Preface: George Boas; Introduction: Joseph Campbell		1967	84	
Selected Works of Miguel de Unamuno	Peace in War	Miguel de Unamuno	Allen Lacy, Martin Nozick, Anthony Kerrigan	Introduction: Allen Lacy	069109926X	1983	85:1	
Selected Works of Miguel de Unamuno	The Private World: Selections from the Diario Íntimo and Selected Letters 1890–1936	Miguel de Unamuno	Anthony Kerrigan, Allen Lacy, Martin Nozick	Introduction: Allen Lacy	0691099278	1984	85:2	
Selected Works of Miguel de Unamuno	Our Lord Don Quixote	Miguel de Unamuno	Anthony Kerrigan	Introduction: Walter Starkie		1967	85:3	
Selected Works of Miguel de Unamuno	The Tragic Sense of Life in Men and Nations	Miguel de Unamuno	Anthony Kerrigan	Introduction: Salvador de Madariaga; Afterword: William Barrett	0691098603	1972	85:4	
Selected Works of Miguel de Unamuno	The Agony of Christianity and Essays on Faith	Miguel de Unamuno	Anthony Kerrigan		0691099332	1974	85:5	
Selected Works of Miguel de Unamuno	Novela/Nivola	Miguel de Unamuno	Anthony Kerrigan	Foreword: Jean Cassou	0691099294	1976	85:6	
Selected Works of Miguel de Unamuno	Ficciones: Four Stories and a Play	Miguel de Unamuno	Anthony Kerrigan	Introduction and Notes: Martin Nozick	0691099308	1976	85:7	
Two Addresses		St.-John Perse	W. H. Auden, Robert Fitzgerald			1966	86	
Collected Poems		St.-John Perse	multiple		0691098581	1971	87:1	
Letters		St.-John Perse	Arthur J. Knodel		0691098689	1978	87:2	
Thomas Taylor the Platonist: Selected Writings		Thomas Taylor		Kathleen Raine, George Mills Harper		1969	88	
Coomaraswamy: Selected Papers	Traditional Art and Symbolism	Ananda Coomaraswamy		Roger Lipsey	0691098859	1977	89:1	
Coomaraswamy: Selected Papers	Metaphysics	Ananda Coomaraswamy		Roger Lipsey	0691099324	1977	89:2	
Coomaraswamy: His Life and Work		Roger Lipsey				1977	89:3	
Studies in Religious Iconography	Religious Art in France, The Twelfth Century	Emile Mâle	Marthiel Mathews	Harry Bober		1978	90:1	
Studies in Religious Iconography	Religious Art in France, The Thirteenth Century	Emile Mâle	Marthiel Mathews	Harry Bober		1985	90:2	
Studies in Religious Iconography	Religious Art in France, The Late Middle Ages	Emile Mâle	Marthiel Mathews	Harry Bober		90:3		
Studies in Religious Iconography	Religious Art after the Council of Trent	Emile Mâle	Marthiel Mathews	Harry Bober		Possibly never published	90:4	
Creative Imagination in the Ṣūfism of Ibn ʿArabī		Henri Corbin	Ralph Manheim		0691098522	1969, 1977, 1998	91:1	
Spiritual Body and Celestial Earth: From Mazdean Iran to Shīʿite Iran		Henri Corbin	Nancy Pearson			1977	91:2	
Samothracian Reflections: Aspects of the Revival of the Antique		Phyllis Williams Lehmann, Karl Lehmann			069109909X	1971	92	
Sabbatai Sevi: The Mystical Messiah, 1626–1576		Gershom Gerhard Scholem	R. J. Zwi Werblowsky		0691099162	1973	93	
The Freud/Jung Letters: The Correspondence between Sigmund Freud and C. G. Jung		Sigmund Freud and C. G. Jung	R. F. C. Hull and Ralph Manheim	William McGuire	0691098905	1974	94	
C. G. Jung Letters	1906–1950	C. G. Jung	R. F. C. Hull	Gerhard Adler and Aniela Jaffé	0691098956		1973	95:1
C. G. Jung Letters	1951–1961	C. G. Jung	R. F. C. Hull	Gerhard Adler and Aniela Jaffé	0691097240	1975	95:2	
Mehmed the Conqueror and His Time		Franz Babinger	Ralph Manheim	William B. Hickman		1978	96	
C. G. Jung Speaking: Interviews and Encounters		C. G. Jung		William McGuire, R. F. C. Hull		1977	97:1	
C. G. Jung: Word and Image		C. G. Jung		Aniela Jaffé	0691099421	1979	97:2	
The Passion of al-Hallāj: Mystic and Martyr of Islam	The life of al-Hallāj	Louis Massignon	Herbert Mason		0691099103	1982	98:1	
The Passion of al-Hallāj: Mystic and Martyr of Islam	The survival of al-Hallāj	Louis Massignon	Herbert Mason		0691099103	1982	98:2	
The Passion of al-Hallāj: Mystic and Martyr of Islam	The doctrine of al-Hallāj	Louis Massignon	Herbert Mason		0691099103	1982	98:3	
The Passion of al-Hallāj: Mystic and Martyr of Islam	Bibliography and index	Louis Massignon	Herbert Mason		0691099103	1982	98:4	
Seminar Notes	Analytical psychology : notes of the seminar given in 1925	C. G. Jung		William McGuire, 2nd edition: Sonu Shamdasani	0691098972	1989, 2012	99	
Seminar Notes	Dream analysis : notes of the seminar given in 1928–1930	C. G. Jung		William McGuire	0691098964	1984	99	
Seminar Notes	Visions: notes of the seminar given in 1930–1934	C. G. Jung		Claire Douglas	0691099715	1997	99	
Seminar Notes	The psychology of Kundalini yoga : notes of the seminar given in 1932	C. G. Jung		Sonu Shamdasani	0691021279	1996	99	
Seminar Notes	Nietzsche's Zarathustra : notes of the seminar given in 1934–1939, 2 volumes	C. G. Jung	originally in English	James L. Jarrett	0691099537	1988	99	
Seminar Notes	Dream interpretation ancient and modern : notes from the seminar given in 1936–1941 : reports by seminar members with discussions of dream series	C. G. Jung	Ernst Falzeder Tony Woolfson	John Peck, Lorenz Jung, Maria Meyer-Grass		2008, 2014	[99]	
The Mythic Image		Joseph Campbell, M. J. Abadie			0691098697	1974	100	
Bollingen: An Adventure in Collecting the Past		William McGuire			0691099510	1982	out-of-series	

== See also ==
- Bollingen Prize
- Bollingen Tower
- Philemon Foundation
