= Archive for Research in Archetypal Symbolism =

Image archive of archetypal symbols

The Archive for Research in Archetypal Symbolism (ARAS) is an encyclopedic collection of archetypal images consisting of photographs of works of art, ritual images, and artifacts of sacred traditions and contemporary art from around the world. The archive is hosted by National ARAS, with institutional members in New York, Los Angeles, Chicago, and San Francisco.

== Overview ==
The ARAS archive contains about 18,000 photographic images collected over more than sixty years, each accompanied by scholarly commentary. The commentary includes a description of the image with a cultural history that places it in context historically and geographically, an important aspect for understanding and working with archetypal images. Where applicable, the commentary brings the image into focus for its modern psychological and symbolic meaning, as well as often including a bibliography for related reading and a glossary of technical terms.

The archive has physical repositories in the cities of its institutional-member hosts; it is also available online (online access does require a subscription) and images are indexed with keywords, including historical, cultural, geographic and other useful terms. ARAS also publishes a quarterly online journal connecting art, culture and depth psychology from a multi-disciplinary perspective that can be subscribed to free of charge on their website, aras.org.

== Usage ==
The ARAS archive is designed for and used by students and scholars for research, by artists and designers as a sourcebook of motifs and iconographic forms, by individuals interested in commonalities in mythology, dream imagery, and vision which transcend nation and ideology, and by practitioners of depth psychology or other psychological perspectives wanting to enhance their knowledge of archetypal symbolism.

Among the scholars who have visited or made use of ARAS' resources are Erich Neumann, who in his The Great Mother: An Analysis of the Archetype (Princeton, 1955) mined ARAS for images of ancient goddesses to explore the archetype of the feminine as it evolved over the centuries from ancient Sumeria and Egypt into the modern era. Two volumes have been published containing a small fraction of the images held by ARAS, entitled An Encyclopedia of Archetypal Symbolism.

== History ==
ARAS was begun—and built to over six thousand images—by spiritualist and scholar Olga Fröbe-Kapteyn, who founded the Eranos conferences in 1933. Each conference had a theme, and Fröbe-Kapteyn collected images to illustrate the topic of each year's meeting. In 1946, Olga Froebe-Kapteyn gave her collection of pictorial artifacts to the Warburg Institute in London, and photographic duplicates were given to the C.G. Jung Institute in Zurich and to the Bollingen Foundation in New York. The collection in New York was edited and further developed, including collection, sorting, and classification of the material and the development of detailed study sheets for every image. This New York archive was eventually renamed the Archive for Research in Archetypal Symbolism and was acquired by the CG Jung Foundation of New York (mirror collections exist at the C.G. Jung Institutes in San Francisco and Los Angeles). The close association of ARAS with the Jung Institutes is "not because a symbolic point of view is limited to Jungians, but because Jung was the particular proponent of a broadly archetypal point of view that insists upon transpersonal and symbolic connections transcending cultural and theological boundaries. This perspective lies at the heart of the archive."

ARAS contains more than 17,000 images from every era of human history, from the Paleolithic and Neolithic eras, from ancient India, Asia Minor, Egypt, and Mycenae, from small tribal societies to great empires. The study sheets that accompany each image provide a detailed description of the image, a cultural history to place it in context, an archetypal commentary which examines the image's modern psychological meaning and offers numerous cross-cultural references to related concepts/images, a bibliography for related reading, and a glossary of technical terms. This detailed documentation renders the library of images accessible to the lay person as well as the specialist scholar, although as the ARAS homepage notes, "There is...no supposition among those working in this field that they have found the one and only way of interpreting archetypal symbolism. The symbol is forever recreating itself anew in the imaginations of those who experience it."

== ARAS online ==
While for many years the archive was accessible only by personal visit to one of the three locations, New York, San Francisco, and Los Angeles, the digitization of the archive has made it accessible to anyone with a computer connected through a web browser to the Internet. ARAS online is built over a powerful search engine accessible through an intuitive user interface, and aided by reference features such as the ARAS cultural timeline. This timeline shows the selected images placed in historical time, and a click on the "live" marker for a particular image opens that image and its descriptive content.

ARAS online content is available only to members. Membership costs $25-$100 a year. ARAS also have a presence on social media and is a non-profit organisation.

== See also ==
- Archetype
- Carl Jung
- Depth psychology
- Dream interpretation
- Symbolism (disambiguation)
