= Ernest Hughes =

Ernest Hughes may refer to:

- Ernest Richard Hughes (1883–1956), British sinologist and missionary
- Ernie Hughes (born 1955), American football player
- Percy Hughes (footballer) (1868–?), Welsh footballer, incorrectly recorded as Ernest
