= Archetype =

Concept in psychology, literature, philosophy

An archetype (/ˈɑːrkɪtaɪp/ AR-ki-type) – a concept used in areas relating to behavior, historical psychology, philosophy and literary analysis – can be any of the following:

1. a statement, pattern of behavior, prototype, "first" form, or a main model that other statements, patterns of behavior, and objects copy, emulate, or "merge" into. Informal synonyms frequently used for this definition include "standard example", "basic example", and the longer-form "archetypal example"; mathematical archetypes often appear as "canonical examples".
2. the Jungian psychology concept of an inherited unconscious predisposition, behavioral trait or tendency ("instinct") shared among the members of the species; as any behavioral trait the tendency comes to being by way of patterns of thought, images, affects or pulsions characterized by its qualitative likeness to distinct narrative constructs; unlike personality traits, many of the archetype's fundamental characteristics are shared in common with the collective and are not predominantly defined by the individual's representation of them; and the tendency to utilize archetypal representations is postulated to arise from the evolutionary drive to establish specific cues corresponding with the historical evolutionary environment to better adapt to it. Such evolutionary drives are: survival and thriving in the physical environment, the relating function, acquiring knowledge, etc. It is communicated graphically as archetypal "figures".
3. a constantly-recurring symbol or motif in literature, painting, or mythology. This definition refers to the recurrence of characters or ideas sharing similar traits throughout various, seemingly unrelated cases in classic storytelling, media, etc. This usage of the term draws from both comparative anthropology and from Jungian archetypal theory.

Archetypes are also very close analogies to instincts, in that, long before any consciousness develops, it is the impersonal and inherited traits of human beings that present and motivate human behavior. They also continue to influence feelings and behavior even after some degree of consciousness developed later on.

== Etymology ==
The word archetype, "original pattern from which copies are made," first entered into English usage in the 1540s. It derives from the Latin noun archetypum, Latinization of the Greek noun ἀρχέτυπον (archétypon), whose adjective form is ἀρχέτυπος (archétypos), which means "first-molded", which is a compound of ἀρχή archḗ, "beginning, origin", and τύπος týpos, which can mean, among other things, "pattern", "model", or "type". It, thus, referred to the beginning or origin of the pattern, model or type.

== Archetypes in literature ==
=== Function ===
Usage of archetypes in specific pieces of writing is a holistic approach, which can help the writing win universal acceptance. This is because readers can relate to and identify with the characters and the situation, both socially and culturally. By deploying common archetypes contextually, a writer aims to impart realism to their work. According to many literary critics, archetypes have a standard and recurring depiction in a particular human culture or the whole human species that ultimately lays concrete pillars and can shape the whole structure in a literary work.

=== Story archetypes ===
Christopher Booker, author of The Seven Basic Plots: Why We Tell Stories, argues that the following basic archetypes underlie all stories:

1. Overcoming the Monster
2. Rags to Riches
3. The Quest
4. Voyage and Return
5. Comedy
6. Tragedy
7. Rebirth

These themes coincide with the characters of Jung's archetypes.

=== Literary criticism ===
Archetypal literary criticism argues that archetypes determine the form and function of literary works and that a text's meaning is shaped by cultural and psychological myths. Cultural archetypes are the unknowable basic forms personified or made concrete by recurring images, symbols, or patterns (which may include motifs such as the "quest" or the "heavenly ascent"; recognizable character types such as the "trickster", "saint", "martyr" or the "hero"; symbols such as the apple or the snake; and imagery) and that have all been laden with meaning prior to their inclusion in any particular work.

The archetypes reveal shared roles universal among societies, such as the role of the mother in her natural relations with all members of the family. These archetypes create a shared imagery which is defined by many stereotypes that have not separated themselves from the traditional, biological, religious, and mythical framework.

== Jungian archetypes ==
The concept of psychological archetypes was advanced by the Swiss psychiatrist Carl Jung, c. 1919. Jung has acknowledged that his conceptualization of archetype is influenced by Plato's Theory of forms, which he described as "the formulated meaning of a primordial image by which it was represented symbolically." According to Jung, the term archetype is an explanatory paraphrase of the Platonic eidos, also believed to represent the word form. He maintained that Platonic archetypes are metaphysical ideas, paradigms, or models, and that real things are held to be only copies of these model ideas. However, archetypes are not easily recognizable in Plato's works in the way in which Jung meant them.

In Jung's psychological framework, archetypes are innate, libidinally collective schemas, universal prototypes for idea-sensory impression images and may be used to interpret observations. A group of memories and interpretations associated with an archetype is a complex (e.g. a mother complex associated with the mother archetype). Jung treated the archetypes as psychological organs, analogous to physical ones in that both are morphological constructs that arose through evolution. At the same time, it has also been observed that evolution can itself be considered an archetypal construct.

Jung states in part one of Man And His Symbols that:

My views about the 'archaic remnants', which I call 'archetypes' or 'primordial images,' have been constantly criticized by people who lack sufficient knowledge of the psychology of dreams and of mythology. The term 'archetype' is often misunderstood as meaning certain definite mythological images or motifs, but these are nothing more than conscious representations. Such variable representations cannot be inherited. The archetype is a tendency to form such representations of a motif—representations that can vary a great deal in detail without losing their basic pattern.

While there are a variety of categorizations of archetypes, Jung's configuration is perhaps the most well known and serves as the foundation for many other models. The four major archetypes to emerge from his work, which Jung originally terms primordial images, include the anima/animus, the self, the shadow, and the persona. Additionally, Jung referred to images of the wise old man, the child, the mother, and the maiden. He believed that each human mind retains these basic unconscious understandings of the human condition and the collective knowledge of our species in the construct of the collective unconscious.

=== Neo-Jungian concepts ===
Other authors, such as Carol Pearson and Margaret Mark, have attributed 12 different archetypes to Jung, organized in three overarching categories, based on a fundamental driving force. These include:

- Ego types:
  1. Innocent
  2. Orphan/Regular person
  3. Hero
  4. Caregiver
- Soul types:
  1. Explorer
  2. Rebel
  3. Lover
  4. Creator
- Self types:
  1. Jester
  2. Sage
  3. Magician
  4. Ruler

Other authors, such as Margaret Hartwell and Joshua Chen, go further to give these 12 archetypes families 5 archetypes each. They are as follows:

- Innocent Family:
  1. Innocent
  2. Child
  3. Dreamer
  4. Idealist
  5. Muse
- Citizen Family:
  1. Citizen
  2. Advocate
  3. Everyman
  4. Networker
  5. Servant
- Hero Family:
  1. Hero
  2. Athlete
  3. Liberator
  4. Rescuer
  5. Warrior
- Caregiver family:
  1. Caregiver
  2. Angel
  3. Guardian
  4. Healer
  5. Samaritan
- Explorer Family:
  1. Explorer
  2. Adventurer
  3. Pioneer
  4. Generalist
  5. Seeker
- Rebel Family:
  1. Rebel
  2. Activist
  3. Gambler
  4. Maverick
  5. Reformer
- Lover Family:
  1. Lover
  2. Companion
  3. Hedonist
  4. Matchmaker
  5. Romantic
- Creator Family:
  1. Creator
  2. Artist
  3. Entrepreneur
  4. Storyteller
  5. Visionary
- Jester Family:
  1. Jester
  2. Clown
  3. Entertainer
  4. Provocateur
  5. Shapeshifter
- Sage Family:
  1. Sage
  2. Detective
  3. Mentor
  4. Shaman
  5. Translator
- Magician Family:
  1. Magician
  2. Alchemist
  3. Engineer
  4. Innovator
  5. Scientist
- Sovereign Family:
  1. Sovereign
  2. Ambassador
  3. Judge
  4. Patriarch
  5. Ruler

== Other uses of archetypes ==
There is also the position that the use of archetypes in different ways is possible because every archetype has multiple manifestations, with each one featuring different attributes. For instance, there is the position that the function of the archetype must be approached according to the context of biological sciences and is accomplished through the concept of the ultimate function. This pertains to the organism's response to those pressures in terms of biological trait.

=== Dichter's application of archetypes ===
Later in the 1900s, a Viennese psychologist named Dr. Ernest Dichter took these psychological constructs and applied them to marketing. Dichter moved to New York around 1939 and sent every ad agency on Madison Avenue a letter boasting of his new discovery. He found that applying these universal themes to products promoted easier discovery and stronger loyalty for brands.

== See also ==
- Allegory of the Cave – Allegory by Plato
- Archetypal pedagogy – Theory of Education by Clifford Mayes
- Archive for Research in Archetypal Symbolism – Image archive of archetypal symbols
- Character archetype – Literary or social stereotype story character
- Character (arts) – Fictional being in a narrative
- Cliché – Overused, unoriginal phrase or opinion
- Dmuta in Mandaeism
- Mental model – Mental representation of the external world
- Monomyth – Pattern in storytelling
- Ostensive definition – Definition by example
- Perennial philosophy – Idea that all religions share a single truth
- Personification – Representation of a thing or abstraction as a person
- Prototype – Early sample or model built to test a concept or process
- Role reversal – Psychotherapeutic technique
- Simulacrum – Representation or imitation of a person or thing
- Stereotype – Generalized belief about people
- System archetypes – Patterns of behavior of a system
- Theory of Forms – Philosophical theory attributed to Plato
- Type (biology) – Specimen(s) chosen to represent a newly described taxon
- Wounded healer – Jungian archetype
