= Karl Lehmann (archaeologist) =

American art historian (1894–1960)

- Born: Karl Leo Heinrich Lehmann; September 27, 1894; Rostock, German Empire
- Died: December 17, 1960 (aged 66); Basel, Switzerland
- Other names: Karl Leo Heinrich Lehmann, Karl Lehmann-Hartleben
- Education: University of Berlin
- Employer: New York University Institute of Fine Arts
- Spouse(s): Elwine Hartleben, Phyllis Williams Lehmann
- Mother: Henni Lehmann
- Relatives: Eva Fiesel (sister)

Karl Leo Heinrich Lehmann (1894–1960) was a German-born American art historian, archaeologist, and professor. He was known for archaeology work in Samothrace, Greece and the related publications. He was a professor at New York University Institute of Fine Arts from 1935, until his death in 1960. Lehmann was the founder and director of the Archaeological Research Fund at New York University

== Early life and education ==
Lehmann was born September 27, 1894, in Rostock, Germany, in a Lutheran household. He was the son of artist Henriette "Henni" Lehmann (1862–1937) and lawyer Karl Lehmann (1858–1918), his sister was Etruscan scholar Eva Fiesel. His family was of Jewish ancestry.

Lehmann studied in Tübingen, Göttingen, and Munich. During World War I from 1917 to 1918, he served as a translator with the Turkish naval command.

In 1922, he received his PhD from University of Berlin. His 1923 thesis was titled, Die antiken Hafenanlagen des Mittelmeeres: Beiträge zur Geschichte des Städtebaues im Altertum (English: The Ancient Port Facilities of the Mediterranean: Contributions to the History of Urban Development in Antiquity) and his doctoral advisor was Ulrich von Wilamowitz-Moellendorff.

== Career ==
In 1923, he was working at the German Archaeological Institute (DAI) at Athens and followed by the German Archaeological Institute at Rome in 1924. From 1925 to 1929, Lehmann taught archeology at the Heidelberg University. Then from 1929 until 1933, he served as the director of the archaeological museum and a professor of archeology at the University of Münster. In April 1933, while he was doing an excavation in Pompeii, Lehmann was discharged from his role by the Nazis, due to his Jewish heritage and his liberal stance politics.

He spent two years in Italy. In 1935 he emigrated to the United States, and joined as a Professor at the New York University Institute of Fine Arts, working alongside Walter William Spencer Cook.

Lehmann was the founder and director of the Archaeological Research Fund at New York University. He was one of the professors involved with the establishment of the Census of Antique Works of Art and Architecture Known in the Renaissance in 1946.

== Death and legacy ==
At the time of his death in 1960, Lehmann was editing the Samothrace publications for the Bollingen Foundation in Switzerland. He died on December 17, 1960, in Basel, Switzerland.

Lehmann's students included Phyllis Pray Bober, Otto Brendel, Bluma L. Trell, Theresa Goell, among others.

== Personal life ==
Lehmann married Elwine Hartleben in 1920, the marriage ended in divorce in 1944. He used a double last name of Lehmann-Hartleben while married to his first wife.

In 1944, he naturalized in the United States. In the same year in 1944, he married the archaeologist Phyllis Williams, who had taken part in the excavations in Samothrace under his direction.

== Publications ==
- Lehmann, Karl (1923). Die antiken Hafenanlagen des Mittelmeeres: Beiträge zur Geschichte des Städtebaues im Altertum [The Ancient Port Facilities of the Mediterranean: Contributions to the History of Urban Development in Antiquity] (dissertation). Leipzig, Germany.
- Lehmann, Karl (1926). Die Trajanssäule: Ein römisches Kunstwerk zu Beginn der Spätantike [The Trajan's Column: A Roman work of Art at the Beginning of Late Antiquity]. Vol. 1. Berlin, Germany.
- Lehmann, Karl (1926). Die Trajanssäule: Ein römisches Kunstwerk zu Beginn der Spätantike [The Trajan's Column: A Roman work of Art at the Beginning of Late Antiquity]. Vol. 2. Leipzig, Germany.
- Lehmann, Karl (1947). Thomas Jefferson: American Humanist. Volume 181 of Phoenix Books. Macmillan.
- Lehmann, Karl (1959). Samothrace: The Hieron. Samothrace: Excavations Conducted by the Institute of Fine Arts of New York University. Vol. 3, Part 2. Pantheon Books.
