= Archaeological Museum of Samothrace =

Archaeological museum in Samothrace, Evros, Greece

Coordinates: 40°30′9.9″N 25°31′41.2″E

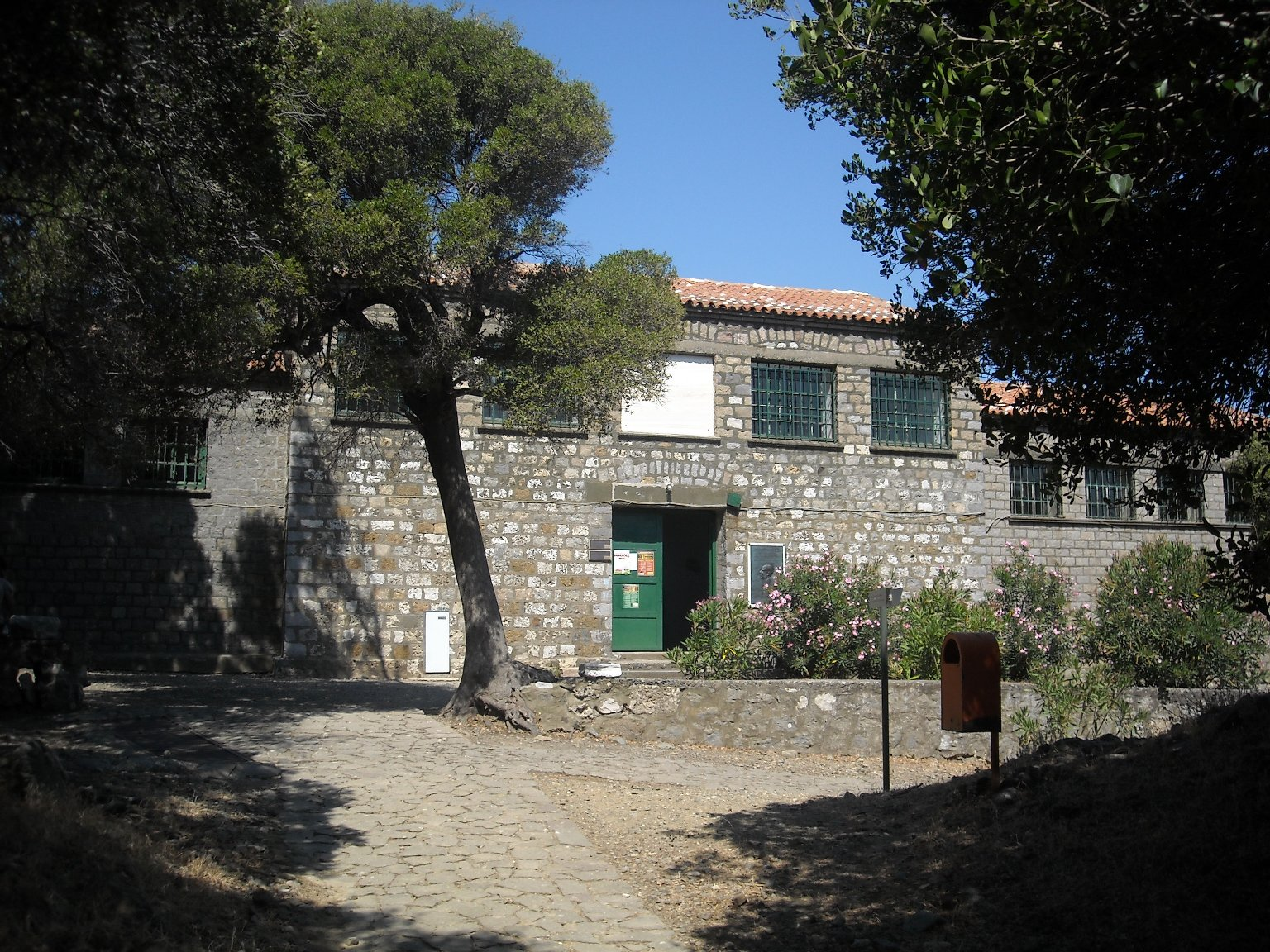
- Established: 1939
- Location: Samothrace, Greece
- Type: Archaeological
- Website: No official website yet

The Archaeological Museum of Samothrace is located in Samothrace of the Evros regional unit, in Greece. It has four rooms and an atrium, presenting the following:

1. Reconstructed architectural remains of the sanctuary;
2. Restored architectural features, sculptures and coins found in the sanctuary;
3. Sculpture, miniature objects and pottery from the sanctuary and ancient city;
4. Archaeological finds from cemeteries;
5. A collection of inscriptions (in the Atrium).

The museum was designed by Stuart Shaw, an architect based at the Metropolitan Museum of Art, New York, and built by the American School of Classical Studies, Athens in 1939–55. A north wing was added in 1960–61.

Among its collection are:

- a winged Nike, found by Dr. Phyllis Williams Lehmann, part of the American School of Classical Studies in 1949
- a plastercast of the Winged Victory of Samothrace in Louvre

and various items from the Samothrace temple complex.

== See also ==
- List of museums in Greece
