= Olga Fröbe-Kapteyn =

Dutch scholar

- Born: October 19, 1881; London
- Died: April 25, 1962; Ascona
- Occupation: Philosopher

Olga Fröbe-Kapteyn (19 October 1881 – 25 April 1962) was a Dutch spiritualist. She lived in Switzerland for most of her life, where she founded, in Ascona, the Eranos Conferences.

== Early life ==
Olga Kapteyn was born in London, the first child of Dutch parents Truus Muysken (1855–1920), a feminist and social activist, and Albertus Kapteyn (1848–1927), an engineer and inventor and older brother of astronomer Jacobus Kapteyn. Her father had moved to London in 1881 to work for the Westinghouse Air Brake Company and by 1887 was the Director-General of the London site. Her mother befriended like-minded people as Bernard Shaw and Peter Kropotkin. Olga attended the North London Collegiate School, where she was a close friend of Marie Stopes. She also studied at the School of Applied Arts in Zurich and the University of Zurich. At the end of the century the Kapteyn family moved to Zürich, Switzerland, where her mother became the center of a group of reform-minded intellectuals. There, Olga Kapteyn studied art history, became an avid skier and mountaineer, and in 1909 married the Croatian-Austrian flutist and conductor Iwan Fröbe, who shared deep interest in aviation and photography with her father. Iwan had been flutist of the local Tonhalle Orchestra since 1908, but his conducting career took the couple to Braunschweig, Munich and by late 1910 to Berlin. At the outbreak of World War I they relocated from Berlin back to Zurich, where Olga Fröbe-Kapteyn had a literary salon known as the "Table Ronde" (round table). They had twin daughters in May 1915, but Iwan died shortly after in a plane crash in September 1915 in Fischamend near Vienna.

== Studies ==
In 1920, Olga Fröbe-Kapteyn and her father visited the Monte Verità Sanatorium in Ascona, Switzerland, and a few years later her father bought the Casa Gabriella, an ancient farmhouse nearby. Here Olga spent the rest of her life. She began to study Indian philosophy and meditation and to take an interest in theosophy. Among her friends and influences were German poet Ludwig Derleth and Richard Wilhelm, whose translation of the I Ching made it accessible to her. She also knew many members of the Ecumenical Circle in Marburg, as well as members of the School of Wisdom (Schule der Weisheit), run by Count Hermann Graf Keyserling in Darmstadt, whose members were engrossed in investigating the common root of all religions. The School of Wisdom is where it is believed that Olga met psychologist Carl Jung, who would later contribute to the first Eranos meetings.

== Eranos Conferences ==
In 1928, with as yet no clear purpose in mind, she built a conference room near her home. Carl Jung suggested that she use the conference room as a "meeting place between East and West" (Begegnungsstätte zwischen Ost und West). This gave birth to the annual meeting of intellectual minds known as Eranos, which today continues to provide an opportunity for scholars of many different fields to meet and share their research and ideas on human spirituality. The name "Eranos" was suggested to her by religious historian Rudolf Otto, whose human-centered concept of religion had a deep impact on the origins and evolution of Eranos. Carl Jung also remained a significant participant in the organization of the Eranos conferences. Although the symposia were not specifically Jungian in focus or concept, they did employ the idea of archetypes. This annual lecture program began in August 1933. The "Eranos Tagungen" invited intellectuals to give scholarly lectures, published as the Eranos Jahrbuch (Eranos year book).

Fröbe-Kapteyn studied symbols, and also created a series of "meditation plates". Since 1978, her works were included in a series of exhibitions, such as the 2021 exhibition Women in Abstraction at the Centre Pompidou.

== Archive for Research in Archetypal Symbolism ==
Olga found images to illustrate some annual lecture. In the 1930s and 1940s, Olga's ongoing research in archetypes took her to major libraries in Europe and America, including the Vatican Library, the British Museum, the Morgan Library in New York City, the Bibliothèque Nationale in Paris and the National Archaeological Museum of Athens. Her diverse and intensive studies provided her with material for her Archive for Research in Archetypal Symbolism which contains more than six thousand images and assisted the research of many Eranos lecturers and other scholars over the years.

== Death ==
Olga Fröbe-Kapteyn edited the first 30 Eranos Yearbooks (1933-1961) and died at her home in Casa Gabriella on April 25, 1962.
