= Ward Goodenough =

American anthropologist (1919–2013)

- Born: Ward Hunt Goodenough II; May 30, 1919; Cambridge, Massachusetts
- Died: June 9, 2013 (aged 94); Haverford, Pennsylvania
- Education: Groton School; Cornell University (BA); Yale University (PhD)
- Occupation: Anthropologist
- Parent(s): Erwin Ramsdell Goodenough; Helen Miriam Lewis
- Relatives: John B. Goodenough (brother)

Ward Hunt Goodenough II (May 30, 1919 – June 9, 2013) was an American anthropologist, who made contributions to kinship studies, linguistic anthropology, cross-cultural studies, and cognitive anthropology.

== Biography and major works ==
Goodenough was born May 30, 1919, in Cambridge, Massachusetts, the son of Helen Miriam (née Lewis) and Erwin Ramsdell Goodenough, a scholar in the history of religion, who was then a graduate student at Harvard Divinity School. He was a brother to noted solid-state physicist John B. Goodenough. As a child his family moved between Europe and Germany as his father conducted research on a Ph.D. As a result, Goodenough developed an early interest in German and languages in general. He began attending Groton School in 1932. In 1937, he began studying at Cornell University. He majored in Scandinavian languages and literature, but was also influenced by the psychologist Leonard S. Cottrell, Jr. and the anthropologist Lauriston Sharp. He earned a B.A. in 1940, and decided to pursue graduate study in anthropology. He enrolled in graduate school at Yale University, but his studies were interrupted by World War II. During the war, Goodenough worked under Samuel Stouffer in the Research unit of the Information and Education Division of the War Department, among other positions. During this period, he developed expertise in quantitative research methods as well as clinical social psychology.

After the war, Goodenough returned to Yale. There, he was a student of George Peter Murdock, who supervised his dissertation. He also took classes with Bronislaw Malinowski and Ralph Linton. In 1947, Goodenough became part of the team of researchers involved in the Coordinated Investigation of Micronesian Anthropology, a large-scale project led by Murdock and funded by the Office of Naval Research. Murdock's assignment was the study of social behavior and religion. He did fieldwork on Chuuk Lagoon with Murdock for seven months in 1947. This research was designed to provide the American government basic information about Micronesia, which it had acquired from the Japanese at the end of the war. It also became a central moment in the history of Micronesian studies and became the start of modern ethnography in that area.

Goodenough completed his Ph.D., entitled "A Grammar of Social Interaction" in 1949. It was later reworked and published as Property, Kin, and Community on Truk. Marshall and Caughey describe it as "the premier publication resulting from CIMA, one of the enduring classics of Pacific ethnography". From 1948 to 1949, Goodenough held a teaching position in Anthropology at the University of Wisconsin–Madison. He moved to the University of Pennsylvania in 1949, where he remained until his retirement in 1989. In 1951, he conducted additional fieldwork in Kiribati, and in 1954 he organized a group of his graduate students on a collaborative ethnographic investigation of New Britain, in Papua New Guinea. This included anthropologists such as Ann Chowning and Charles Valentine and Edith Valentine.

In the mid-1950s, Goodenough earned a reputation as a key anthropological theorist. In papers like "Componential Analysis and the Study of Meaning" he pioneered a scientifically rigorous study of culture. But he was active on other fronts as well. His long volume Cooperation in Change: An Anthropological Approach to Community Development (1963) was an important contribution to applied anthropology, and he also completed a textbook entitled Culture, Language, and Society (1981). In 1968, he was invited to give the Lewis Henry Morgan lectures, one of the highest honors in American anthropology, which were later published as Description and Comparison in Cultural Anthropology. Throughout his career Goodenough continued to produce specialist ethnographic works on Micronesia, most notably a Trukese-English Dictionary (1990) and a monograph on pre-Christian religious traditions on Chuuk entitled Under Heaven's Brow (2002).

As Goodenough matured, he continued to gain in eminence and received additional honors and awards. He served as the president of the Society for Applied Anthropology in 1963, was the editor of American Anthropologist (the top journal in American anthropology) from 1966 to 1970, was elected member of the Anthropology section of the National Academy of Sciences in 1971, a member of the American Philosophical Society in 1973, a member of the American Academy of Arts and Sciences in 1975, and was also the president of the Institute on Religion in an Age of Science in 1987. He served as the department chair at Penn from 1976 to 1982. Goodenough also held visiting positions at Cornell University, Swarthmore College, Bryn Mawr College, University of Hawaii, University of Wisconsin at Milwaukee, Yale University, Colorado College, the University of Rochester, and at St. Patrick's College in Ireland.

== Main ideas and contributions ==
An expert on Chuukese kinship, Goodenough's best known work is the development of a method for applying componential analysis to the study of kinship terminology, and his disagreements with David M. Schneider about the value of formal analyses of Kinship terminology. He also developed Ralph Linton's Status/Role theory, also applying a structural componential analysis.

== Selected publications ==
- 1951. Property, Kin and Community on Truk. Yale University Publications in Anthropology, No. 46.
- 1955. "A Problem in Malayo-Polynesian Social Organization." American Anthropologist 57:71-83.
- 1956. "Residence Rules." Southwestern Journal of Anthropology 12:22-37.
- 1956. "Componential Analysis and the Study of Meaning." Language 32(1):195-216.
- 1957. "Oceana and the Problem of Controls in the Study of Cultural and Human Evolution." Journal of the Polynesian Society 66:146-155.
- 1957. "Cultural anthropology and linguistics". In: Garvin, Paul L. (Hg.): Report of the Seventh Annual Round table Meeting on Linguistics and Language Study. Washington, D.C.: Georgetown University, Monograph Series on Language and Linguistics No. 9. P. 167–173
- 1964. (Editor) Explorations in Cultural Anthropology: Essays in Honor of George Peter Murdock. New York: McGraw-Hill Book Company.
- 1965. "Yankee Kinship Terminology: A Problem in Componential Analysis." In E.A. Hammel, ed., Formal Semantic Analysis, pp259–297. Special Publication, American Anthropologist, vol. 67, no. 5, pt. 2.
- 1963. Cooperation in Change: An Anthropological Approach to Community Development. New York: Russell Sage Foundation.
- 1970. Description and Comparison in Cultural Anthropology. Chicago: Aldine.
- 1971. Culture Language and Society. Reading, Mass.: Addison-Wesley Modular Publications, No. 7.
- 2002. Under Heaven’s Brow: Pre-Christian Religious Tradition in Chuuk. Memoirs of the American Philosophical Society, Volume 246. Philadelphia: American Philosophical Society.
- Goodenough, Ward H. (2003). "In Pursuit of Culture". Annual Review of Anthropology. 32: 1–12. doi:10.1146/annurev.anthro.32.061002.093257.
