= Carol S. Pearson =

American author and educator

- Born: 21 March 1944; Chicago
- Education: Rice University
- Employers: Georgetown University; Goucher College; Pacifica Graduate Institute (2009–2013); University of Colorado Boulder; University of Maryland (2005–2009)
- Scientific career
- Workplaces: University of Colorado Boulder; University of Maryland (2005–2009); Goucher College; Georgetown University; Pacifica Graduate Institute (2009–2013)
- Website: www.carolspearson.com

Carol S. Pearson is an American author and educator. She develops new theories and models with an applied practical bent, building on the work of psychiatrist C. G. Jung, psychoanalyst James Hillman, mythologist Joseph Campbell, and other depth psychologists.

Pearson is best known as the author of The Hero Within: Six Archetypes We Live By (1986, 1989, 1998), which was a HarperSanFrancisco best-seller, followed by the more expansive Awakening the Heroes Within: Twelve Archetypes to Help Us Find Ourselves and Transform Our World (1991). With the assistance of Hugh Marr, she co-created the Pearson-Marr Archetype Indicator (PMAI), published by the Center for Applications of Psychological Type (CAPT), to help people better understand their motivations, their unconscious assumptions, and the narratives they think, tell, and live.

Her most recent book, Persephone Rising: Awakening The Heroine Within, published in October 2015, bridges the genres of depth psychology, myth scholarship, and memoir. It draws on archetypal stories from an ancient Greek mystery religion as a guide to thriving today in a world in flux. It concludes with an analysis of narrative intelligence as an important aspect of emotional intelligence that also builds cognitive complexity. In April 2016, Persephone Rising received a gold medal from the Nautilus Book Awards in the category of books for women.

In addition to such books written for the general public, Pearson has made contributions to the fields of education, marketing and branding, organizational development, and leadership through publications such as Educating the Majority: Women Challenge Tradition in Higher Education, co-editors, Donna L. Shavlik and Judith G. Touchton (1989); The Hero and the Outlaw: Building Extraordinary Brands Through the Power of Archetypes, co-author, Margaret Mark (2001); Mapping the Organizational Psyche: A Jungian Theory of Organizational Dynamics and Change, co-author, John G. Corlett (2004); and The Transforming Leader: New Approaches to Leadership for the Twenty-First Century (2012).

She designed the Organizational and Team Culture Indicator, also published by CAPT, to help organizational development and human resource professionals and marketers understand organizational cultures. Kenexa, a global human resources company, bought the OTCI instrument from CAPT. IBM later acquired Kenexa and translated the instrument for global use. It is now known as the IBM Kenexa Organizational Cultural Insight Survey.

== Early life and education ==
Pearson was born in Chicago in 1944, the eldest child of Thelma (Widman) and John A. Pearson. At the age of two, she moved with her family to Houston, Texas, where she attended public schools and later Rice University, from which she received a BA (1966), MA, (1968), and PhD (1970). She has one younger sibling, John Douglas Pearson. She is married to David R. Merkowitz, a political and public affairs consultant, and has two step-children, Jeffrey Merkowitz, who works at the U.S. Department of the Treasury, and Stephen Merkowitz, a gravitational physicist at NASA's Goddard Space Flight Center, and a daughter, Shanna Pearson-Merkowitz, a political science professor at the University of Rhode Island, as well as six grandchildren.

Pearson began her study of archetypal theory and narrative intelligence in the English Department at Rice University, which emphasized the myth/symbol school of literary studies. Later in her career, she earned a Doctor of Ministry degree from Wisdom University (2012), a graduate school originally called the University of Creation Spirituality and now part of Ubiquity University, that explores the progressive mystic traditions in religions throughout the world. She also holds an honorary Doctor of Humane Letters degree from Norwich University.

== Academic career ==
Pearson's academic career began with a series of faculty positions in the 1970s. First hired as an assistant professor in the English Department at the University of Colorado, she was selected as the founding director of the CU Women Studies Program and was instrumental in developing Frontiers: A Journal of Women Studies, one of the earliest academic journals in the field. She subsequently was recruited to be the first director of the Women’s Studies Program at the University of Maryland, College Park, where she negotiated to bring the offices of the National Women's Studies Association and the journal Feminist Studies to the campus.

During her tenure at UMD, Pearson was selected to be a fellow in the American Council on Education Fellows Program, the nation's premier higher education leadership development program. She spent her fellowship year at the University of North Carolina at Charlotte, working with the chancellor of the university and other senior administrators. Upon returning to UMD, she accepted an invitation to spend part of her time as a visiting scholar at the American Council on Education's Center for Leadership Development. She also worked with ACE's Office of Women in Higher Education to develop “The New Agenda of Women for Higher Education.”

As Pearson moved into leadership positions, she began to explore leadership studies scholarship. She worked at two women's colleges, serving first as vice president for Academic Affairs and Dean of Goucher College in Towson, MD, and later as Dean of the Mount Vernon Institute at Mount Vernon College in Washington, DC. From 1998 to 2005, Pearson was Senior Editor of The Inner Edge: A Resource for Enlightened Business Practice, published bi-monthly by InnoVision Communications, and then the Director of the Transformational Leadership Certificate Program at the Center for Professional Development at Georgetown University. During this period, she also was President of Meristem, a nonprofit education and training organization.

From 2005 to 2009, Pearson served as Director of the James MacGregor Burns Academy of Leadership in the School of Public Policy at the University of Maryland. The academy incubated the International Leadership Association, of which she was a member of the board of directors. She also co-led a Leadership for Transformation project, out of which grew her edited volume The Transforming Leader, which was honored by the International Leadership Association at its 2014 global conference for making a significant contribution to the field.

In 2009, Pearson left UMD to take a position as Executive Vice President and Provost at Pacifica Graduate Institute in Carpinteria, California, later becoming the school's president. Pacifica offers graduate degrees in Jungian and archetypal studies, psychology, mythology, and several other fields. Since leaving Pacifica in 2013, Pearson has continued to write, teach, consult, and lead workshops, but has retired from academic leadership.

Pearson's current interests have expanded from exploring archetypes in organizations and individuals to their role in social systems. In 2009, she wrote a monograph for the Fetzer Institute, called Maturing the American Dream, which identified archetypes in U.S. culture and their likely implications for the future. Most recently, Pearson's blogs and other social media communications have explored the interface between archetypal patterns in individuals and larger social groups as well as more general philosophical and psycho-spiritual issues.

== Primary publications ==
- Persephone Rising: Awakening The Heroine Within, San Francisco; HarperElixir, 2015. (ISBN 978-0062318923)
- The Transforming Leader: New Approaches to Leadership for the Twenty-First Century, Oakland; Berrett-Koehler, 2012. (ISBN 978-1609941208)
- Maturing the American Dream, Fetzer Institute, 2009.
- Mapping the Organizational Psyche: A Jungian Theory of Organizational Dynamics and Change, co-author, John G. Corlett, Gainesville, FL; Center for Applications of Psychological Type (CAPT), 2004. (ISBN 978-0935652697)
- The Hero and the Outlaw: Building Extraordinary Brands Through the Power of Archetypes, co-author, Margaret Mark, New York; McGraw-Hill Education, 2001. (ISBN 978-0071364157)
- Magic at Work: Camelot, Creative Leadership, and Everyday Miracles, co-author, Sharon Seivert, New York; Doubleday, 1995. (ISBN 978-0385417297)
- Awakening the Heroes Within: Twelve Archetypes To Help Us Find Ourselves and Transform Our World, San Francisco; HarperElixer, 1991. (ISBN 978-0062506788)
- Educating the Majority: Women Challenge Tradition in Higher Education, co-editors, Donna L. Shavlik and Judith G. Touchton, Washington D.C.; American Council on Education, 1989. (ISBN 978-0029248102)
- The Hero Within: Six Archetypes We Live By San Francisco; HarperElixer, 1986. (ISBN 978-0062515551)
- The Female Hero in American and British Literature, New Providence; R.R. Bowker, 1981. (ISBN 978-0835214667)
- Who Am I This Time? Female Portraits in British and American Literature, co-editor, Katherine Pope, New York; McGraw-Hill, Inc., 1976. (ISBN 978-0070490321)

== Instruments ==
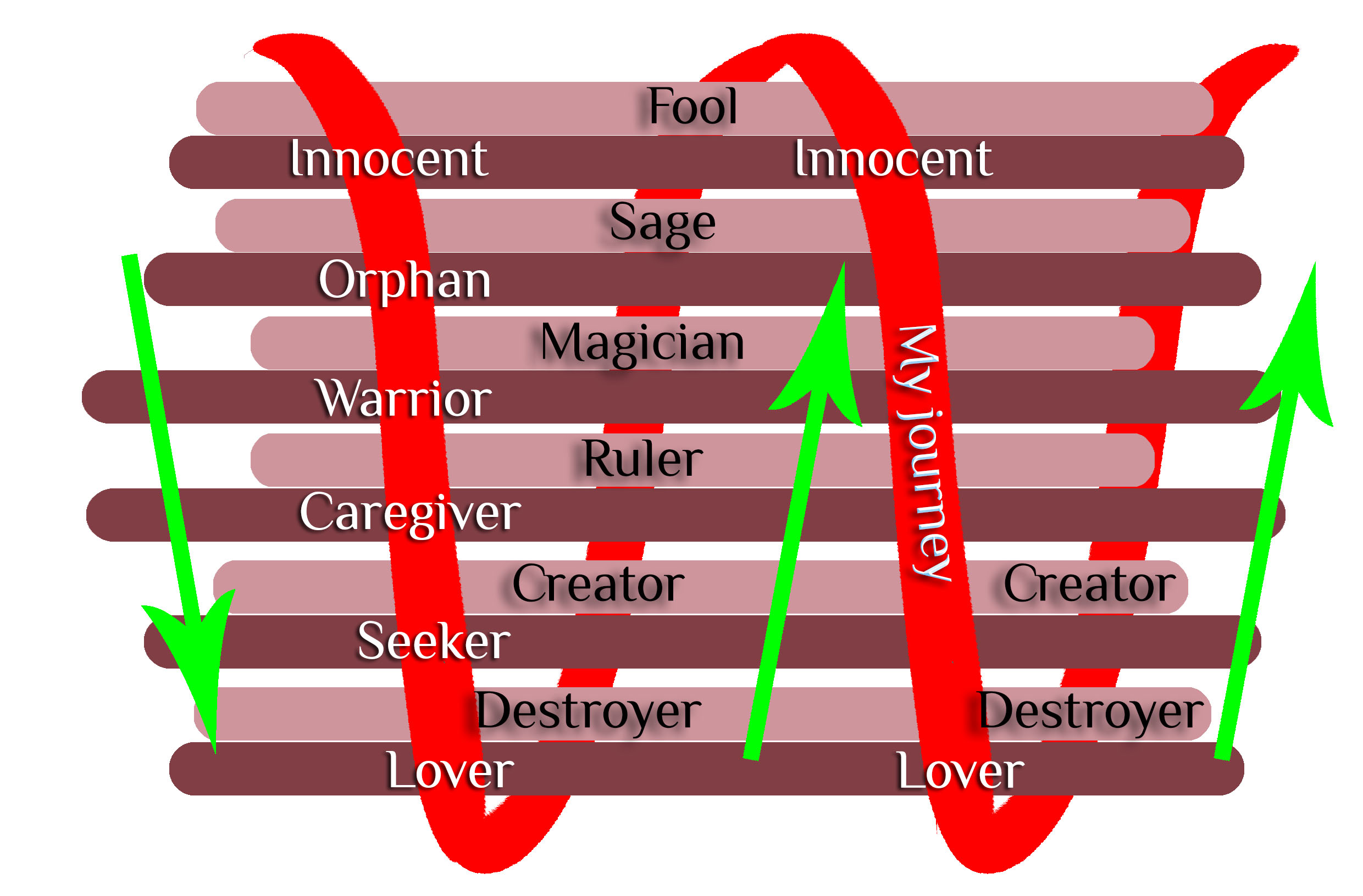
Hero's journey according to PMAI.

- Introduction to Archetypes: The Guide to Interpreting Results from the Pearson-Marr Archetype Indicator Instrument™, co-author, Hugh Marr, Gainesville, FL; Center for Applications of Psychological Type (CAPT), 2002. (ISBN 978-0935652673)
- PMAI Manual: A Guide for Interpreting the Pearson-Marr Archetype Indicator Instrument, co-author, Hugh Marr, Gainesville, FL; Center for Application of Psychological Type (CAPT), 2003. (ISBN 978-0935652741)
- What Story Are You Living? A Guide to Interpreting Your PMAI Instrument Results, co-author, Hugh Marr, Gainesville, FL; Center for Applications of Psychological Type (CAPT), 2006. (ISBN 978-0935652789)
