= Wounded healer =

Jungian archetype

Wounded healer is a term created by psychiatrist Carl Jung. The idea states that an analyst is compelled to treat patients because the analyst himself is "wounded." The idea may have Greek mythology origins. Victor et al. (2022) found that 82% of applied psychology graduate students and faculty members in the United States and Canada experienced mental health conditions at some point in their lives.

As an example, of the "wounded healer phenomenon" between an analyst and their analyzed:

- The analyst is consciously aware of their own personal wounds. These wounds may be activated in certain situations especially if the analyzed wounds are similar to their own.
- The analyzed wounds affect the wounds of the analyst. The analyst either consciously or unconsciously passes this awareness back to their analyzed, causing an unconscious relationship to take place between analyst and analyzed.

== Research ==
There are various studies researching the concept of the wounded healer, most notably that by British counselor and psychotherapist Alison Barr who studied the significance of psychological wounds on people who decide to train as counsellors or psychotherapists. Barr used a pluralistic approach to her research, with the quantitative data analyzed using descriptive and inferential statistics and the qualitative data analyzed using thematic analysis, with a grounded theory approach. An on-line questionnaire was conducted with 253 respondents. Pilot and verification studies were performed, and opportunities for further research highlighted.

Barr’s results showed that 73.9% of counselors and psychotherapists have experienced one or more wounding experiences leading to career choice. She also noted the following:

- In relation to the significance of the event(s) on career choice, when merging the categories ‘probably chosen career regardless’ with ‘possibly chosen career regardless’, and ‘unlikely chosen career regardless’ with ‘not considered career otherwise’, there is a slight majority in relation to the former. There are no significant differences in relation to demographic factors.
- In relation to whether one or more psychologically wounding experiences led to the choice of a career as a therapist, there is a significant difference within designation, gender, grouping gender and ethnicity, and, grouping gender and age. There are no significant differences within approach, ethnicity or age.
- The majority of the wounds were caused by events experienced directly by the respondents (65%) as opposed to indirectly or both. Within demographic factors, the causes of the wounding experiences leading to career choice are not statistically significant.
- The exact causes of the wounds vary enormously. The main categories are abuse, family life as a child, mental ill-health (own), social, family life as an adult, bereavement, mental ill-health (others), life-threatening, physical ill-health (others), physical ill-health (own), and, other.
- There are many implications for the future of the therapeutic world, focusing mainly on supervision and training.

The largest prevalence study on lived experience within the mental health field by Victor et al. (2022), found that 82% of clinical psychology, counselling psychology, and school psychology graduate students and faculty members in United States and Canada experienced mental health conditions at some points of their lives.

The idea of the wounded healer has since expanded to include the study of any professional healers who have been wounded themselves, including counselors, psychotherapists, doctors and nurses.

== Mythological origins ==
In Greek mythology, the centaur Chiron was a "Wounded Healer", after being poisoned with an incurable wound by one of Hercules's arrows. Jung mentioned the Chiron myth "wounding by one's own arrow means, first of all, the state of introversion";

For Jung, "a good half of every treatment that probes at all deeply consists in the doctor's examining himself... it is his own hurt that gives a measure of his power to heal. This, and nothing else, is the meaning of the Greek myth of the wounded physician."

Jung felt that depth psychology can be potentially dangerous, because the analyst is vulnerable to being infected by his analysis by having his own wounds reopened. To avoid this, the analyst must have an ongoing relationship with the unconscious, otherwise he or she could identify with the "healer archetype", and create an inflated ego.

Withdrawal of both projections may however ultimately activate the powers of the inner healer in the patients themselves.

Jung’s closest colleague, Marie Louise Von Franz, said “the wounded healer IS the archetype of the Self [our wholeness, the God within] and is at the bottom of all genuine healing procedures.”

Jungians warn of the dangers of inflation and splitting in the helping professions, involving projection of the 'wounded' pole of the archetype onto the patient alone, with the analyst safely separated off as 'healer'.

== Jung's wound ==
Scholars suggest that Jung's childhood vulnerabilities compelled him to heal his own life. Jung stated that "certain psychic disturbances can be extremely infectious if the doctor himself has a latent predisposition in that direction...For this reason he runs a risk - and must run it in the nature of things". Further he stated that "it is no loss, either, if [the analyst] feels that the patient is hitting him, or even scoring off him: it is his own hurt that gives the measure of his power to heal".

Jungians acknowledge that Jung's own wounds could cause damage to those he was attempting to heal.

== Cultural analogues ==
- Akira Kurosawa's 1948 film Drunken Angel centers upon the efforts of Doctor Sanada, himself an alcoholic, to sustain a young gangster against tuberculosis, counseling him to abandon his self-destructive lifestyle.
- The character Dr. House, from the television series of the same name, can be considered as an example of this archetype in modern pop culture; his physical and emotional scars are both a burden and a driving force in his need to fix the problems of others while destroying himself.
- In East Coker, T. S. Eliot wrote "The wounded surgeon plies the steel/That questions the distempered part".

== See also ==
- Empathy
- Healer
- Sin-eater
