= Eva Fiesel =

Etruscan scholar

- Born: Eva Lehmann; December 23, 1891; Rostock, German Empire
- Died: May 27, 1937 (aged 45); New York City, New York, US
- Other name: Eva Lehmann Fiesel
- Education: University of Rostock
- Known for: Etruscan grammar, philosophy of language
- Spouse: Ludolf Fiesel
- Relatives: Karl Leo Heinrich Lehmann (brother)
- Scientific career
- Fields: Linguistics, Etruscology
- Workplaces: Ludwig-Maximilians-Universität München, Yale University, Bryn Mawr College
- Doctoral advisor: Gustav Herbig

Eva Fiesel, née Lehmann (born 23 December 1891 in Rostock; died 27 May 1937 in New York), was a German linguist and scholar of Etruscan.

== Life ==
Her father Karl Lehmann was Professor of Law and Rector of the University of Rostock from 1904 to 1905, and from 1911 in Göttingen. Her mother was the painter Henni Lehmann, and her brother Karl Leo Heinrich Lehmann became a well-known archaeologist. In 1915, she married Ludolf Fiesel, a lecturer at Rostock, in Göttingen. In the winter semester of 1916 to 1917, she enrolled in the University of Rostock.

She received her PhD in 1920 from the University of Rostock on the subject of grammatical gender in Etruscan, supervised by Gustav Herbig. Fiesel divorced in 1926 and subsequently raised her children as a single mother. From 1931 to 1933, Fiesel taught as a private lecturer (Privatdozentin) at the Ludwig-Maximilians-Universität München. In July 1933, despite protests, she lost her position there because she was a Jew by birth.

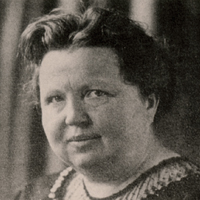
Henni Lehmann (date unknown)

After a long research stay in Florence with Giorgio Pasquali, she immigrated to the US with her thirteen-year-old daughter Ruth in 1934, one year before her brother Karl, at the invitation of linguist Edgar Howard Sturtevant. She taught as a research assistant at Yale University, where at the time she was the only woman to hold such a role; later she was appointed visiting professor at Bryn Mawr College, Pennsylvania, an all-female, private residential College. She died at the age of 46 of liver cancer, only months after the death of her mother.^{[302]}

== Works ==
- Fiesel, Eva. 1927. Die Sprachphilosophie der deutschen Romantiker [Philosophy of language of the German Romantics]. Tübingen: J. C. B. Mohr.
- Fiesel, Eva. 1931. Etruskisch [Etruscan]. Berlin/Leipzig: Walter de Gruyter.
- Fiesel, Eva. 1936. X presents a Sibilant in Early Etruscan. American Journal of Philology 57, 261–270.
