= Bluma L. Trell =

American Professor and Classicist

- Born: Bluma Lee Popkin; March 10, 1903; New York, NY
- Died: June 10, 1997 (aged 94); Englewood, NJ
- Occupations: Classicist, archaeologist, numismatist, professor, attorney
- Notable work: Temple of Artemis replica on permanent display at the British Museum
- Spouse: Max Trell

Bluma Lee Popkin Trell was an American classicist, archaeologist, and numismatist. She earned a law degree from New York University at age 21 and had a private law practice for several years before becoming bored and returning to her studies. She was later a professor of Classics at New York University, and a recognized expert on the Temple of Artemis at Ephesus. Her reconstruction of the temple was on display at the British Museum and was used as a model in a painting by Salvador Dali. At NYU, the Bluma L. Trell Prize is awarded each year to a graduating senior who has made notable contributions in the field of Classics.

In 1973, Trell participated in a protest against the Metropolitan Museum's attempt to sell 6,000 ancient coins that it had lent the American Numismatic Society. A photograph of Trell playing the cello with the NYU Student Orchestra at the Society during the protest appeared in the New York Times and the New York Post which generated a lot of publicity and likely contributed to the success of the protest.

In 1977, Trell published Coins and Their Cities: Architecture on the Ancient Coins of Greece, Rome and Palestine, along with renowned British Museum authority Martin Price.

== Personal life ==
Bluma Lee Popkin was born in 1903 to Max Popkin, a portrait painter who helped establish the Grand Central Art Galleries, and Mary Samuels Popkin.

In 1924, she married screenwriter Max Trell, and they had one son named Max Trell Jr.

== Awards ==
- American Council of Learned Societies grants, 1964, 1968, 1972, 1973, 1977
- National Science Foundation grant, 1973
- New York University, teaching award, 1975

== Education ==
Trell earned her degrees from New York University: LL.B. in 1924, B.A. in 1935, and Ph.D. in 1942. Trell completed her dissertation, "Architectura Numismatica Part II, Temples in Asia Minor" in 1942, with Karl Lehmann-Hartleben as her advisor.

== Publications ==
- Trell, Bluma L (1942). Architectura Numismatica. Part II : Temples in Asia Minor (Thesis). OCLC 58669277. ProQuest 301834913.
- Trell, Bluma L. (1945). "The Temple of Artemis at Ephesos". Numismatic Notes and Monographs (107): ii–71. JSTOR 45278013.
- Trell, Bluma L. (1964). "A Numismatic Solution of Two Problems in Euripides". The Numismatic Chronicle and Journal of the Royal Numismatic Society. 4: 93–101. JSTOR 42662585.
- Trell, Bluma L. (1964). "The Cult-Image on Temple-Type Coins". The Numismatic Chronicle and Journal of the Royal Numismatic Society. 4: 241–246. JSTOR 42662598.
- Trell, Bluma L. (1970). "Architectura Numismatica Orientalis: A Short Guide to the Numismatic Formulae of Roman Syrian Die-Makers". The Numismatic Chronicle. 10: 29–50. JSTOR 42681898.
- Trell, Bluma L. (1972). "Architectura Numismatica: Early Types: Greek, Roman, Oriental: An extended review of G. Fuchs, 'Architekturdarstellungen auf römischen Münzen'". The Numismatic Chronicle. 12: 45–59. JSTOR 42666335.
- Trell, Bluma L. (1976). "Architecture on Ancient Coins". Archaeology. 29 (1): 6–13. JSTOR 41706006.
- Price, Martin; Trell, Bluma L. (1977). Coins and their cities: architecture on the ancient coins of Greece, Rome, and Palestine. London: Vecchi. ISBN 978-0-8143-1586-6.
- Trell, Bluma L. (1978). "Epigraphica Numismatica Monumental Nymphaea on Ancient Coins". The Bulletin of the American Society of Papyrologists. 15 (1/2): 147–161. JSTOR 24518770.
- Trell, Bluma L. (1988). "Ancient Coins as Evidence for the History of Art". Bulletin of the Asia Institute. 2: 53–65. JSTOR 24048210.
- Clayton, Peter A.; Price, Martin (2013). "The Temple of Artemis At Ephesos". The Seven Wonders of the Ancient World. doi:10.4324/9780203820131. ISBN 978-1-136-74810-3.
