= Max Raphael =

German-American art historian (1889–1952)

Max Raphael (August 27, 1889 – July 14, 1952) was a German-American art historian. He was of Jewish parentage. He was born on August 27, 1889, in Schönlanke, Prussia, Germany. Between 1924 and 1932 he taught art history to the working class at the Volkhochschule in Berlin. With the rise of the Nazis he moved to Paris, where he continued his writing. After the Germans occupied Paris in 1940 he was temporarily interned at Gurs internment camp and Camp des Milles. Once released he migrated, with help from the Quakers, to the United States through Barcelona and Lisbon. In New York Raphael lived in penury until he received one of the first fellowships awarded by the Bollingen Foundation. He died by suicide in New York City on July 14, 1952.

== Works ==
- Zur Erkenntnistheorie der konkreten Dialektik, 1934, French translation published by Galimard as Théorie marxiste de la connaissance.
- Prehistoric Cave Paintings, New York, Pantheon, 1945, Bollingen Series, no. 4.
- Prehistoric Pottery and Civilization in Egypt, New York, Pantheon, 1947, Bollingen Series, no. 8.
- The Demands of Art, Princeton University Press, 1968 (posthumous), Bollingen Series, no. 78.
