= Percy Hughes (footballer) =

Welsh footballer

Personal information
- Full name: Edward Percival Whitley Hughes
- Date of birth: 1868
- Position: Defender

Senior career*
Years	Team	Apps	(Gls)
1886–1889	Bangor		

International career
1887–1889	Wales	3	(0)
- * Club domestic league appearances and goals

Edward Percival Whitley Hughes (born 1868; date of death unknown), commonly known as Percy Hughes, was a Welsh footballer who played as a defender and made three appearances for the Wales national team.

== Career ==
Hughes made his international debut for Wales on 12 March 1887 in the 1886–87 British Home Championship against Ireland, which finished as a 1–4 loss in Belfast. His next two appearances for Wales were in 1889 during the 1888–89 British Home Championship, featuring against England on 23 February and Ireland on 27 April, the latter match for his third and final cap.

== Career statistics ==
=== International ===
Wales
Year	Apps	Goals
1887	1	0
1889	2	0
Total	3	0
