= Allen Lacy =

- Born: David Allen Lacy III; January 7, 1935; Dallas, Texas, U.S.
- Died: December 27, 2015 (aged 80); Linwood, New Jersey, U.S.
- Education: Duke University
- Occupations: Author, philosophy professor, gardening columnist
- Spouse: Hella Goethert (m. 1958)
- Writing career
- Period: 1979–2000
- Genres: Gardening essays, horticulture, philosophy

Allen Lacy (1935–2015) was an American author, philosophy professor, and gardening columnist for both The Wall Street Journal and The New York Times.

His 1962 Duke University PhD thesis was on Miguel de Unamuno.

== Books ==
- In a Green Shade: Writings from Homeground (2000)
- The Inviting Garden: Gardening for the Senses, Mind, and Spirit (1998)
- The Gardener's Eye and Other Essays (1995)
- Home Ground: A Gardener's Miscellany (1992)
- The Garden in Autumn (1990)
- Farther Afield: A Gardener's Excursions (1986)
