= Kathleen Coburn =

Canadian academic (1905–1991)

Kathleen Coburn

Kathleen Hazel Coburn OC FRSC (September 7, 1905 – September 23, 1991) was a Canadian academic and a leading authority on the poet Samuel Taylor Coleridge.

Born in Stayner, Ontario, a fourth generation Canadian of Scottish–Irish descent, Coburn was one of six children born to John Coburn, a Methodist minister, and Susannah Wesley Emerson, Coburn was educated at Harbord Collegiate Institute in Toronto, Ontario, Canada, and later studied at the University of Toronto, taking a BA in 1928 and an MA in 1930. Having been awarded an Imperial Order of the Daughters of the Empire War Memorial Scholarship (IODE) to Oxford in 1930, she obtained a BLitt from St Hugh's College, Oxford in 1932.

In 1930 the 25-year-old Coburn visited The Chanter's House at Ottery St Mary in Devon, which had been the home of the Coleridge family for centuries. Here she discovered an extensive archive of documents written by Samuel Taylor Coleridge. Geoffrey Coleridge, 3rd Baron Coleridge gave her unlimited access to this archive, and allowed her to have it photographed and the copies placed in the British Museum for the benefit of future scholars. He also granted her permission to edit and publish Coleridge's Notebooks, which she edited from 1957 to 1990.

In 1949 Coburn was instrumental in negotiating the sale of this Chanter's House archive to the British Museum for £10,200, with a donation from the Pilgrim Trust. The collection was eventually deposited with the British Museum in May 1951.

Coburn spent her entire academic career at Victoria College in the University of Toronto, firstly for four years as Assistant to the Dean of Women before joining the English Department in 1936, becoming Professor in 1953 until her retirement in 1971. She received a Leverhulme Award in 1948, a Guggenheim Fellowship in 1953, was made a Fellow of the Royal Society of Canada in 1957, an Honorary Fellow of St Hugh's College, Oxford in 1970, an Officer of the Order of Canada in 1974, an honorary DLitt of the University of Cambridge in 1975, and an honorary Doctorate from the University of Toronto in 1978 in recognition of her achievement in the field of Samuel Taylor Coleridge research and study. In 1983, she received an honorary Doctorate of Humane Letters from Princeton University. She was awarded the Pierre Chauveau Medal by the Royal Society of Canada in 1979 and the Rose Mary Crawshay Prize in 1990.

Coburn made a bequest to Victoria College to set up 'Coburn Fellowships' where up to three Fellowships a year valued at $20,000 are awarded to Canadian and Israeli students who are studying in the fields of Fine Art or Humanities. The E. J. Pratt Library in the Victoria University in the University of Toronto has the Kathleen Coburn Reading Room, which is dedicated to Coburn's memory.

Coburn published her autobiography, 'In Pursuit of Coleridge' , in 1977. She died in Toronto, Ontario in 1991.

== Publications ==
- Coburn, Kathleen. 'Coleridge; A Collection of Critical Essays. Englewood Cliffs, N.J.: Prentice-Hall, 1967
- Experience into Thought: Perspectives in the Coleridge Notebooks. Toronto: University of Toronto Press, 1979
- The Grandmothers. Toronto: Oxford University Press, 1949
- In Pursuit of Coleridge. Toronto: Clarke, Irwin, 1977
- The Self Conscious Imagination: A Study of the Coleridge Notebooks in Celebration of the Bi-centenary of his Birth 21 October 1772. London: Oxford University Press, 1974
- Coleridge, Samuel Taylor. The Collected Works of Samuel Taylor Coleridge. General ed., Kathleen Coburn. London: Routledge and K. Paul; Princeton: Princeton University Press, 1969
- Inquiring Spirit: A New Presentation of Coleridge from his Published and Unpublished Prose Writings. Ed. Kathleen Coburn. Toronto: University of Toronto Press, 1979
- Notebooks. Ed. Kathleen Coburn. New York: Pantheon Books, 1957-1990
- Hutchinson, Sara. Letters from 1800-1835. Ed. Kathleen Coburn. London: Routledge & Paul, 1954
