= Claire Douglas =

British journalist and writer

Claire Douglas is an English author and former journalist. She is known for her Sunday Times-bestselling thrillers that focus on women in key roles.

== Early life ==
Douglas grew up in Chipping Sodbury, near Bristol in Gloucestershire.

Douglas wanted to be a writer from the age of seven. Douglas studied journalism at university.

== Career ==
Douglas began her career in journalism and worked as a features writer for fifteen years, during which time she wrote for women’s magazines and national newspapers and had a short story published in Women’s Weekly magazine.

Douglas entered a writing competition the first three chapters of a contemporary novel plus a synopsis held by Marie Claire magazine. She won the competition and secured a publishing contract with Harper Collins in the UK and was introduced to a literary agent.

By 2017, her books had been published in 13 countries, and by 2019 four of her titles had sold more than 240,000 copies. Douglas is a Sunday Times bestselling author and her novels have been selected as Richard and Judy Book Club picks. In Germany, seven of her novels have become bestsellers.

Douglas has also contributed articles to CrimeReads.

== Personal life ==
As of 2024, she is based in Bath, Somerset. She is married and has two children.

== Publications ==
=== Novels ===
- The Sisters (2015)
- Local Girl Missing (2016)
- Last Seen Alive (2017)
- Do Not Disturb (2018)
- Then She Vanishes (2019)
- Just Like the Other Girls (2020)
- The Couple at No 9 (2021)
- The Girls Who Disappeared (2022)
- The Woman Who Lied (2023)
- The Wrong Sister (2024)
- The New Neighbours (2025)

=== Short stories ===
- The Text (2017)
