= Erwin Ramsdell Goodenough =

American religious scholar (1893–1965)

Erwin Ramsdell Goodenough (24 October 1893 – 20 March 1965) was an American religious scholar. He is specifically noted for his study of the influence of Greek culture on Judaism, what some call Hellenistic Judaism, and for his discovery and studies on Synagogal Judaism.

== Biography ==
Goodenough was born on October 24, 1893, in Brooklyn, the son of Ward Hunt Goodenough and Mary Belle (née Ramsdell). He studied at Hamilton College, Drew University, and then received a bachelor's degree in theology from Garrett–Evangelical Theological Seminary in 1917. He went on to Harvard University for three years, then three more years at the University of Oxford, where he received a Doctor of Philosophy in 1923.

Goodenough then began teaching at Yale University in 1923, where he taught until he retired in 1962. He went on to Brandeis University, then was given an office in the Widener Library at Harvard. He received honorary degrees from Yale, Hebrew Union College – Jewish Institute of Religion, and Uppsala University.

Goodenough edited the Journal of Biblical Literature from 1934 to 1942.

Goodenough's papers are archived at Yale. After his death, he was honored by a volume of studies in his honor, Religions in Antiquity: Essays in Memory of Erwin Ramsdell Goodenough, edited by Jacob Neusner, published by E. J. Brill in 1968 (reprinted by Wipf and Stock in 2004).

Goodenough's first marriage, to Helen Miriam (née Lewis), produced two noted professors: University of Pennsylvania anthropologist Ward Goodenough (1919–2013) and University of Texas solid-state physicist John B. Goodenough (1922–2023, who in 2019 became the oldest-ever Nobel laureate); and his second marriage, to Evelyn (née Pitcher), produced two more: Ursula Goodenough and Daniel Goodenough.

== Publications ==
- 1923. The Theology of Justin Martyr.
- 1929. The Jurisprudence of the Jewish Courts in Egypt.
- 1930. The Church in the Roman Empire.
- 1935. By Light, Light: The Mystic Gospel of Hellenistic Judaism.
- 1937. Religious Tradition and Myth.
- 1938. The Politics of Philo Judaeus, with a General Bibliography of Philo.
- 1940. An Introduction to Philo Judaeus.
- 1953-1968. Jewish Symbols in the Greco-Roman Period. Twelve volumes of text and illustrations, plus a thirteenth of indexes, maps and corrigenda over many years. An abridged version with the same title was edited by Jacob Neusner (Princeton 1988).
- 1955. Toward a Mature Faith.
- 1968. Religions in Antiquity: Essays in Memory of Erwin Ramsdell Goodenough. Ed. by Jacob Neusner (1968).
