= Coleridge's notebooks =

Notebooks of the English writer Samuel Taylor Coleridge

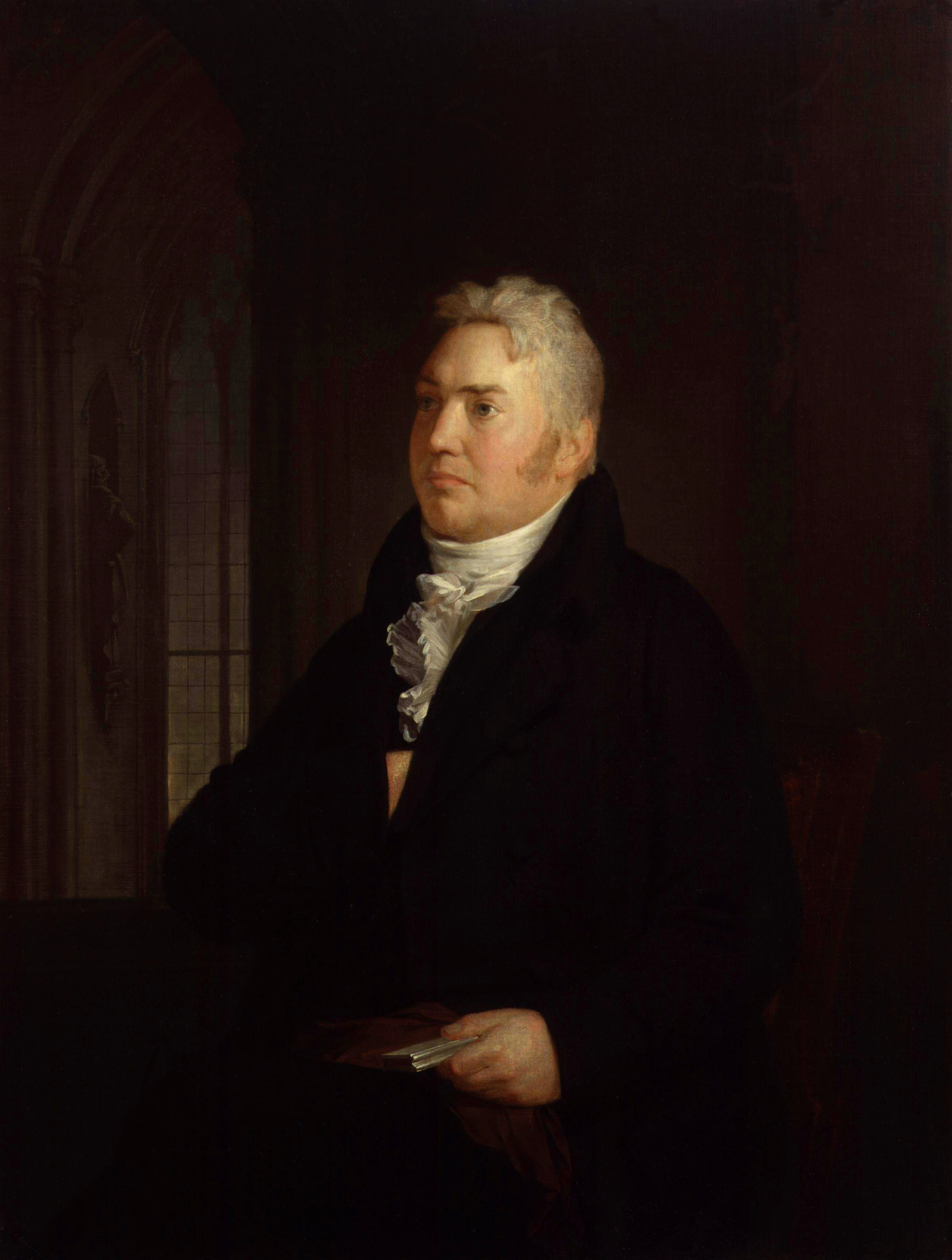
Samuel Taylor Coleridge portrayed by Washington Allston in 1814

Coleridge's notebooks, of which seventy-two have survived, contain a huge assortment of memoranda set down by the poet Samuel Taylor Coleridge from 1794 until shortly before his death in 1834. Coleridge's biographer Richard Holmes summarised the range of material covered as "travels, reading, dreams, nature studies, self-confession and self-analysis, philosophical theories, friendships, sexual fantasies, lecture notes, observations of his children, literary schemes, brewing recipes, opium addiction, horrors, puns, prayers." Some of this vast storehouse of material found its way into Coleridge's published works, and it is also believed to have directly influenced Wordsworth's poems. The notebooks have been described as "unique in the annals of Romantic autobiography", and as "perhaps the unacknowledged prose masterpiece of the age".

== Publication history ==
Coleridge originally had no intention of making his notebooks public, but in his later years he came to think of them as a legacy to be passed down to his disciples. He even allowed his friend Robert Southey to use a number of extracts in their collaborative work Omniana, published in 1812 and reprinted in an expanded form in 1836. In 1895 the poet's grandson Ernest Hartley Coleridge released a larger selection under the title Anima Poetæ, and the following year the scholar Alois Brandl published in Germany an edition of the first notebook. The notebooks were not made available in a complete form until Kathleen Coburn produced the lavishly annotated Bollingen Edition. Coburn began work on this in the 1930s; the first volume appeared in 1957, and the fifth and final one (completed by Anthony John Harding) in 2002, 11 years after her death. Work is in progress on an electronic index to this edition. In 2002 a new selection from the notebooks, restricted to those kept in the British Library, was published under the editorship of Seamus Perry.

== Modern editions ==
- Kathleen Coburn, Merton Christensen and Anthony John Harding, eds. (1957–2002) The Notebooks of Samuel Taylor Coleridge. Bollingen Series L. Princeton: Princeton University Press. ISBN 0691098026, 0691098034, 0691098042, 0691099065 and 0691099073
- Seamus Perry, ed. (2002) Coleridge's Notebooks: A Selection. Oxford: Oxford University Press. ISBN 0198712014
