= Anthony Kerrigan =

American translator of Spanish literature (1918–1991)

- Born: Anthony Kerrigan; March 14, 1918; Winchester, Massachusetts, U.S.
- Died: March 7, 1991 (aged 72); Bloomington, Indiana, U.S.
- Occupations: Translator, poet, critic
- Writing career
- Notable works: Selected Works of Miguel de Unamuno (Bollingen/Princeton University Press); English edition of Borges's Ficciones (1962)
- Notable awards: National Book Award (Translation, 1975)

Anthony Kerrigan (March 14, 1918 – March 7, 1991) was an American translator, poet, and literary critic best known for his multi-volume editions of Miguel de Unamuno in English for the Bollingen Series (Princeton University Press) and for editing and introducing the first complete U.S. edition in English of Jorge Luis Borges's Ficciones (Grove Press, 1962). He won the National Book Award in Translation in 1975 for Unamuno's The Agony of Christianity and Essays on Faith, and was also a 1974 finalist for The Tragic Sense of Life in Men and Nations.

== Life and career ==
Kerrigan was born in Winchester, Massachusetts, and died in Bloomington, Indiana, aged 72.

A later profile summarized his background and early years, noting his Massachusetts origins and childhood in Cuba before his adult career as a translator of Spanish and Latin American literature.

From the 1960s onward Kerrigan became closely associated with the Bollingen Series at Princeton University Press, serving as editor-translator (and, in later volumes, contributor) to Selected Works of Miguel de Unamuno, a seven-volume undertaking in the Bollingen Series LXXXV.

In 1962 Grove Press published the first complete English-language edition of Borges's Ficciones in the United States. Kerrigan served as editor and wrote the introduction to that volume.

Kerrigan was a Senior Guest Scholar at the Helen Kellogg Institute for International Studies, University of Notre Dame, during the 1980s, where he continued editorial and translation work. Among his later projects was a new annotated English translation of José Ortega y Gasset's The Revolt of the Masses (University of Notre Dame Press/W. W. Norton, 1985), edited by Kenneth Moore and with a foreword by Saul Bellow. He also translated and annotated Borges and María Kodama's Atlas (E. P. Dutton, 1985).

Kerrigan's papers, including correspondence and manuscripts related to his translations of Borges, Camilo José Cela, Reinaldo Arenas, Ortega y Gasset and Unamuno, are held at the University of Notre Dame's Hesburgh Libraries.

== Works ==
=== Poetry ===
- Lear in the Tropic of Paris (Tobella, 1952).
- Espousal in August (Dublin: Dolmen Press, 1968). Limited ed., 125 copies.
- At the Front Door of the Atlantic (Dublin: Dolmen Press, 1969). With a Picasso frontispiece.

=== Selected translations and editorial work ===
- Editor and introduction, J. L. Borges, Ficciones (New York: Grove Press, 1962).
- Editor/translator (series): Selected Works of Miguel de Unamuno (Bollingen Series LXXXV). Princeton University Press. 7 vols. (1967–1980).
- Translator, Miguel de Unamuno, The Tragic Sense of Life in Men and Nations (Princeton University Press/Bollingen, 1974). National Book Award finalist (1974).
- Translator, Miguel de Unamuno, The Agony of Christianity and Essays on Faith (Princeton University Press/Bollingen, 1974). National Book Award winner (1975).
- Translator/annotator with introduction, José Ortega y Gasset, The Revolt of the Masses (University of Notre Dame Press / W. W. Norton, 1985).
- Translator/annotator, Jorge Luis Borges (with María Kodama), Atlas (New York: E. P. Dutton, 1985).

== Honors ==
- National Book Award for Translation (1975), for Unamuno's The Agony of Christianity and Essays on Faith; finalist (1974) for The Tragic Sense of Life in Men and Nations.

== Legacy and archives ==
Kerrigan's influence on the reception of Unamuno and Borges in the English-speaking world has been noted in critical and scholarly discussions of twentieth-century translation from Spanish. His papers are housed at the University of Notre Dame's Hesburgh Libraries.

== See also ==
- List of translators
