= Eranos Foundation =

Intellectual discussion group dedicated to humanistic and religious studies

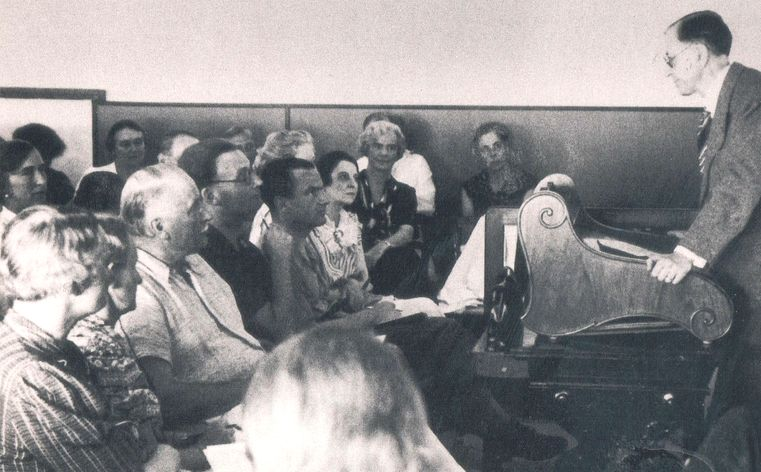
A lecture during an Eranos meeting in 1938

Eranos is an intellectual discussion group dedicated to humanistic and religious studies, as well as to the natural sciences which has met annually in Moscia (Lago Maggiore), the Collegio Papio and on the Monte Verità in Ascona, Switzerland since 1933.

It has also been the name for a circle of scholars at Heidelberg (Germany) in the early 20th century. Among others, Max Weber and Ernst Troeltsch were members of the "Heidelberg Eranos".

The name is derived from the Ancient Greek word ἔρανος meaning "a banquet to which the guests bring contributions of food, a no-host dinner." The circle at Moscia was founded by Olga Froebe-Kapteyn in 1933, and these conferences have been held annually on the grounds of her estate (on the shores of Lago Maggiore near Ascona in Switzerland) ever since. For over seventy years this event has served as a point of contact for thinkers from disparate fields of knowledge ranging from depth psychology and comparative religion to history, literary criticism and folklore, and provides a setting and a congenial group within which to discuss all things spiritual. Each conference takes place over eight days, during which time all participants eat, sleep and live together, thereby promoting a camaraderie which fosters an atmosphere of free and open discussion. Each year a new theme is addressed, and each participant scholar delivers a two-hour lecture on a topic of his choice relating to the theme — his/her contribution to the ‘banquet’ of ideas — thereby attempting to draw these multifarious thinkers into productive intellectual discourse.

== Eranos’ beginnings ==
Froebe-Kapteyn established this group at the suggestion of the eminent German religious historian, Rudolf Otto. Froebe-Kapteyn was the Dutch foundress of the literary salon "Table Ronde" (Round Table), which is indicative of the Eranos’ ‘spiritualist’ bent. Indeed, Eranos was from its very outset interested in these issues and its first theme, ‘Yoga and Meditation in East and West’, was a truly pioneering subject in the early 1930s. Past themes include Ancient Sun Cults and the Symbolism of Light in the Gnosis and in Early Christianity (1943), Man and Peace (1958), Creation and Organization (1966) and The Truth of Dreams (1995). Participants over the years have included Heinrich Zimmer (Indian religious art), Karl Kerényi (Greek mythology), Mircea Eliade (history of religions), Carl Gustav Jung and Erich Neumann (analytical psychology), Robert Eisler (gospel authorship), Alfons Rosenberg (symbolism), Gilles Quispel (gnostic studies), Gershom Scholem (Jewish mysticism), Henry Corbin (Islamic religion), Gilbert Durand (symbolic anthropology), Adolf Portmann (biology), Herbert Read (art history), Max Knoll (physics), and Joseph Campbell (comparative mythology). The Eranos conferences have resulted in the publication of a number of books. Anyone may attend the lectures upon payment of a small fee.
