= Phyllis Williams Lehmann =

American archaeologist

Phyllis Williams Lehmann (November 30, 1912 – September 29, 2004) was an American classical archaeologist who specialised in the Samothrace temple complex, where she discovered a third statue of Winged Victory (1949), which is kept today at the Archaeological Museum of Samothrace and recovered missing fingers of the hand of the famous Winged Victory of Samothrace at the Louvre.

== Biography ==
Phyllis Williams was born November 30, 1912, in Brooklyn, New York. Williams received a B.A. degree from Wellesley College in 1934.

She first visited Samothrace in 1938, as a doctoral student on the New York University Institute of Fine Arts team led by professor Karl Leo Heinrich Lehmann. She was awarded her PhD in 1943 and married Lehmann the following year. She was assistant field director of the excavations at Samothrace 1948–1960 and acting director 1960–1965, and she remained closely involved with Samothrace for the rest of her career. She was a member of the faculty of Smith College from 1946 to 1978, and was Dean of Smith College from 1965 to 1970.

Among her publications are The Pedimental Sculptures of the Hieron in Samothrace (1962) and Samothrace III: The Hieron, (1969), which was awarded the Hitchcock Award of the Society of Architectural Historians in 1969. She was elected a Fellow of the American Academy of Arts and Sciences in 1979.

In 1970 she retired to her home in Haydenville, Massachusetts, where she died of congestive heart failure on September 29, 2004.
