= Viktor Zuckerkandl =

Austrian musicologist

Viktor Zuckerkandl (2 July 1896 – 5 April 1965) was a Jewish-Austrian musicologist.

He grew up in Vienna as the son of the urologist Otto Zuckerkandl and his wife Amalie, née Schlesinger. As early as 1912, he was a student of the music theorist Heinrich Schenker. His doctorate was granted in 1927 from Vienna University; he had previously studied piano under Richard Robert. Zuckerkandl conducted freelance throughout the 1920s. He was a critic for Berlin newspapers from 1927 to 1933 and taught theory and appreciation courses in Vienna from 1934 to 1938. He emigrated to the US in 1940, teaching at Wellesley College until 1942, when he took a job as a machinist in the war effort. From 1946 to 1948 he taught theory at The New School in New York, and joined the faculty at St. John's College, Annapolis in 1948. He remained at St. John's, teaching music as part of their Great Books program until his retirement in 1964. Zuckerkandl died in Locarno, Switzerland, in 1965.

His explanations of music theory were heavily indebted to the theories of musicologist Heinrich Schenker, and his understandings of musical perception owed much to Gestalt psychology, as well as German phenomenology. Zuckerkandl believed music was part of the "mystical aspect of human existence", and sought to explain its existence in all cultures as a universal phenomenon. He was not well known until scholars rediscovered his works in the 1990s.

== Works ==
- Prinzipien und Methoden der Instrumentation in Mozarts Werken (diss., U. of Vienna, 1927)
- Musikalische Gestaltung der grossen Opernpartien: jugendlich-dramatisches Fach (Berlin, 1932)
- Die Weltgemeinschaft der Juden (Zürich, 1938)
- Sound and Symbol, 1956
- The Sense of Music, 1959
- Die Wirklichkeit der Musik (Zürich, 1963)
- Vom musikalischen Denken, 1964
- Man the Musician, 1973
