= Paul Friedländer (philologist) =

German philologist (1882–1968)

- Born: 21 March 1882; Berlin, Kingdom of Prussia, German Empire
- Died: 10 December 1968 (aged 86); Los Angeles, California, United States

Academic background
- Education: University of Berlin

Paul Friedländer (March 21, 1882, Berlin – December 10, 1968, Los Angeles) was a German philologist specializing in classical literature and UCLA professor.

== Biography ==
He studied under Ulrich von Wilamowitz-Moellendorff at the University of Berlin. In 1911 he became a Privatdozent and from 1914 Associate Professor in Berlin, becoming a Professor at Marburg University (1920), University of Halle (1932).

In 1935, the antisemite policies of the Nazi regime forced him to resign; in 1938 he was detained in the Sachsenhausen-Oranienburg concentration camp. After his release, he managed to escape Germany and emigrated to the United States.

In the United States, he taught at Johns Hopkins University in 1939, and later as a lecturer and at UCLA (1940–1945 as a lecturer, after 1945 as a professor).

== Selected works ==
- Herakles: Sagengeschichtliche Untersuchungen. Berlin: Weidmann 1907
- Johannes von Gaza und Paulus Silentiarius: Kunstbeschreibungen justinianischer Zeit. Leipzig : Teubner 1912 (Nachdruck: Hildesheim 1969)
- Der grosse Alcibiades Band 1/2 Bonn: Friedrich Cohen 1921/23
- Aufgaben der klassischen Studien an Schule und Universität, 1922 (with Walther Kranz)
- Die griechische Tragödie und das Tragische, 1925–1926
- Platon, 3 vols. Berlin: De Gruyter 1928 ff.
- Plato: An Introduction. Translated by Hans Meyerhoff. 1973. ISBN 9780691017952.
- Athanasius Kircher und Leibniz, 1937.
- Epigrammata. Greek inscriptions in verse. Berkeley: Univ. of California Press, 1948.
- Studien zur antiken Literatur und Kunst. Berlin: De Gruyter 1969

== See also ==
- Calder, William M. III and Bernhard Huss (eds), 'The Wilamowitz in Me': 100 Letters between Ulrich von Wilamovitz-Moellendorff and Paul Friedlaender (1904–1931) (Los Angeles: Charles Young Research Library, University of California, 1999). OCLC 464968784.
- Inge Auerbach: Catalogus professorum academiae Marburgensis. Zweiter Band: 1910 bis 1971. Marburg 1979, S. 500–501
- Hans-Georg Gadamer: Paul Friedländer (1882–1968). In: Eikasmós. Band 4 (1993), S. 179–182.
- Hans Peter Obermayer: "Vom KZ Sachsenhausen nach Los Angeles – Paul Friedländer". In: id., "Deutsche Altertumswissenschaftler im amerikanischen Exil. Eine Rekonstruktion". Berlin: De Gruyter Berlin 2014, p. 597–672.
- Domenico Accorinti: “Paul Friedländer and Nonnus’ Poetry”. In: Berenice Verhelst (ed.), Nonnus of Panopolis in Context IV: Poetry at the Crossroads. Leuven: Peeters 2022, p. 477–509.
- Walter Tetzlaff: 2000 Kurzbiographien bedeutender deutscher Juden des 20. Jahrhunderts. Lindhorst: Askania 1982, S. 92.
- Deutsche Biographische Enzyklopädie. Band 3, S. 453.
