= Denys Spittle =

Stanley Denys Trevor Spittle OBE, MA, FSA, (Cambridge 1920 – 7 December 2003) was an English archaeologist.

== Biography ==
Spittle studied architecture at Pembroke College, Cambridge, and in 1935 became a member of the “Friends of the Fitzwilliam Museum”. Spittle was involved in the 1951 Samothrace Expedition of the New York University Institute of Fine Arts which unearthed two ancient Greek structures - a hall for votive gifts of the sixth century B.C. and a great altar court. Spittle also contributed to the reports on the preceding excavations, published in 1964 and 1982. He was Editor (in charge), Cambridge office, Royal Commission on the Historical Monuments of England, involved in studying the wall paintings at Pembroke College, of the archaeological sites of Cambridgeshire, the archaeological sites of Northamptonshire, as well as the historic town of Stamford, Lincolnshire. He also produced illustrations. He was made a Fellow of the Society of Antiquaries in 1956. He served as president of the Royal Archaeological Institute, 1981–1984.

Spittle was an important collector of art with an extensive collection including 25 illuminated manuscripts; these manuscripts originally belonged to Sir Thomas Watson, and when Watson died in 1921 he left 25 volumes, which eventually ended up in the hands of Spittle. Shortly before his own death in 2003 Spittle helped devise the (2007) exhibition at the Fitzwilliam Museum, Cambridge, entitled "Private Pleasures: Illuminated manuscripts from Persia to Paris", which showcased his collection of manuscripts dating from the 10th to the 20th centuries. Highlights included a Byzantine Gospel, a Flemish Book of Hours, an Ottoman Koran and a Venetian copy of Cicero. Dr Stella Panayotova, Keeper of Manuscripts and Printed Books at the Fitzwilliam Museum and the curator of Private Pleasures, said "This exhibition celebrates the passion for medieval manuscripts, the pleasure of collecting them and the excitement of sharing them with others. We are delighted to have the opportunity to display this selection of treasures from so personal a collection."
