= Ernest Richard Hughes =

British missionary and sinologist

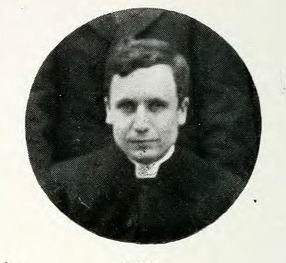
- Born: 5 January 1883
- Died: 20 October 1956 (aged 73)

Ernest Richard Hughes (5 January 1883 – 20 October 1956) was a British sinologist and missionary. He was a missionary in China (1911–1931), and Reader for Chinese philosophy and religion at Oxford University (1934–1942).

He translated The Spirit of Chinese Philosophy by the Chinese philosopher Fung Yu-lan into English.

== Selected publications ==
- The Invasion of China by the Western World. (Pioneer Histories). Adam and Charles Black, London, 1937 (digitisation)
- Chinese Philosophy in Classical Times (Everyman's Library). Littlehampton Book Services Ltd, 1950 (digitisation)
- (with Katherine Hughes) Religion in China (Hutchinson's University Library).Hutchinson, 1950 (digitisation)
- Art of Letters: Lu Chi's "Wen Fu," A.D. 302, A Translation and Comparative Study (Bollingen Series, No. 29). Pantheon Books, Copyright 1951
- Two Chinese Poets: Vignettes of Han Life and Thought. 1960 (Google Books)
- (as translator) Fung Yu-lan: The Spirit of Chinese Philosophy. 1947 (digitisation)
- (as translator) The Great Learning & the Mean-in-Action. Newly translated from the Chinese, with an Introductory Essay on the History of Chinese Philosophy. London: Dent, 1942
- (foreword) O. Brière; Laurence G. Thompson (translated from French) Fifty Years of Chinese Philosophy 1898–1950. 1956 (digitisation) (Original: „Les courants philosophiques en Chine depuis 50 ans. (1898–1950)“, Bulletin de l'Université l'Aurore, Série III, X. (1949), 561–654)
