= Depth psychology =

Psychological approach

Depth psychology (from the German term Tiefenpsychologie) is the practice and research of the science of the unconscious, covering both psychoanalysis and psychology. It is also defined as the psychological theory that explores the relationship between the conscious and the unconscious, as well as the patterns and dynamics of motivation and the mind. The theories of Sigmund Freud, Carl Gustav Jung, and Alfred Adler are all considered its foundations.

== Development ==
The term "depth psychology" was coined by Eugen Bleuler and refers to psychoanalytic approaches to therapy and research that take the unconscious into account. The term was rapidly accepted in the year of its proposal (1915) by Sigmund Freud, to cover a topographical view of the mind in terms of different psychic systems. He is considered to have revolutionized this field, which he viewed in his later years as his most significant work.

Since the 1970s, depth psychology has come to refer to the ongoing development of theories and therapies pioneered by Pierre Janet, William James, and Carl Gustav Jung, as well as Freud. All explore relationships between the conscious and the unconscious (thus including both psychoanalysis and Jungian psychology).

== Summary of primary elements ==
Depth psychology states that the psyche process is partly conscious, partly unconscious, and partly semi-conscious. In practice, depth psychology seeks to explore underlying motives as an approach to various mental disorders. Depth psychologists believe that the uncovering of deeper, often unconscious, motives is intrinsically healing in and of itself. It seeks knowledge of the deep layers underlying behavioral and cognitive processes.

In modern times, the initial work, development, theories, and therapies of Sigmund Freud, Carl Jung, Alfred Adler and Otto Rank have grown into three main perspectives on depth psychology:

- Psychoanalytic: Melanie Klein and Donald Winnicott (among others); object relations theory; neo-Freudianism
- Adlerian: Adler's individual psychology
- Jungian: Jung's analytical psychology; James Hillman's archetypal psychology

== Adlerian view ==
Adlerian psychology has been regarded as depth psychology due to its aim of discovering the buried unconscious phenomena. It is one of the first frameworks that approached the individual as a fundamentally social being, one that needs to be situated in a socio-cultural context in order to be understood. It is also described as a representation of the ego psychology and views the ego as an independent and creative entity that facilitates the interaction with social reality instead of merely a handmaiden of the id.

The Adlerian approach to psychoanalysis includes a set of tools that allows an individual to break through a self-centered way of life. For instance, it eliminates the core style of life and fictional final goal of a patient through Socratic method as opposed to counselling.

== Jungian views ==
Many scholars believe that Jung's most significant contribution to depth psychology was his conceptualization of the "collective unconscious". While Freud cited the conceptualization unconscious forces was limited to repressed or forgotten personal experiences, Jung emphasized the qualities that an individual shares with other people. This is demonstrated in his notion that all minds, all lives, are ultimately embedded in some sort of myth-making in the form of themes or patterns. This myth-making or creation of a mythical image lies at the depth of the unconscious, where an individual's mind widens out and merges into the mind of mankind. Mythology is therefore not a series of old explanations for natural events, but rather the richness and wonder of humanity played out in a symbolical, thematic, and patterned storytelling.

There is also the case of the Jungian archetypes. According to Jung, archetypes are primordial elements of the Collective Unconscious. They form the unchanging context from which the contents of cyclic and sequent changes derive their meanings. Duration is the secret of action. He also stated that the psyche spontaneously generates mythico-religious symbolism or themes, and is therefore spiritual or metaphysical, as well as instinctive, in nature. An implication of this is that the choice of whether to be a spiritual person may be beyond the individual, whether and how we apply it, including to nonspiritual aspirations.

Another Jungian position in depth psychology involves his belief that the unconscious contains repressed experiences and other personal-level issues in its "upper" layers and "transpersonal" (e.g. collective, non-I, archetypal) forces in its depths. The semi-conscious contains or is an aware pattern of personality, including everything in a spectrum from individual vanity to the personality of the workplace.

== See also ==
- ARAS
- Complex
- Individual psychology
- Post-Freudianism
- Psychoanalysis
- Psychotherapy
- Triune brain
