= Johannes Tautz =

German educationist and writer (1914–2008)

Johannes Tautz (30 September 1914 in Koblenz am Rhein to 13 March 2008 in Dortmund, was a historian, religious scholar, anthroposophist, author and Waldorf teacher. He concerned himself with a better understanding of National Socialism and with questions of education in the twentieth century.

== Childhood and Studies ==
Johannes Tautz and his younger sister grew up with their father, who ran his own business, and their mother, a librarian in Koblenz, attended the Realschule, where a teacher, Gerhard Schnell, introduced him to Anthroposophy. Schnell ran a private study group on Steiner's The Riddles of Philosophy. Through him Tautz was able to hear a first lecture by Hans Büchenbacher at the Cusanus-Branch of the Anthroposophical Society.

Tautz took up Oriental studies, Religious studies and the History of Philosophy as "the National Socialist demon had not taken these over yet." In Hebrew, Ancient Greek and Sanskrit he began to read the ancient spiritual texts in their original form.

At a summer conference in Dornach he met Marie Steiner in the audience during a performance of Albert Steffen's play The Death Experience of Manes, experienced Günther Schubert and Erich Schwebsch lecturing and saw the first Mystery Play of Rudolf Steiner. In 1936, he attended a conference in the exhibition hall of Cologne carried by the leading priests of the Christian Community where he heard Friedrich Rittelmeyer and Emil Bock for the first time.

He moved from Bonn to the university of Berlin where, thanks to a regular change of rooms, he was able to evade the pursuit of the Party, for he was categorised as "politically unreliable" and could obtain only a provisional study permit. Here he was able to hear the lectures of Nicolai Hartmann, Romano Guardini and Eduard Spranger. On Easter 1937, he participated in a conference in Dornach where the first part of Goethe's Faust was being performed and where he heard and had a personal conversation with Friedrich Rittelmeyer. In the academic year 1938/1939 he continued his studies in Tübingen.

At the start of the war, Tautz was called up, only to be dismissed once again on account of the studies he had not yet completed. His was occupied with the later philosophy of Schelling and submitted his dissertation on "Schelling's philosophical anthropology." In it he used two citations of Rudolf Steiner, which led to an official policy statement by Alfred Baeumler, director of the Advanced School of the NSDAP to Prof Hauer, both of whom had been central to evaluating the Anthroposophical work in Germany that led to its prohibition. After a considerable time, Baeumler wrote the following:

"In these two footnotes it is not a matter of drawing on an author in the manner customary in scientific works but rather of a confession to the "reality of Schelling's view on Nature and Spirit" in the sense of Rudolf Steiner and a confession to a dark "source" that can only mean Anthroposophy. The ingenuous attempt of Mr Tautz shows how important it is right at the moment to be wakeful. The Germany universities are not there to support an attempt to block the living development of German idealism by means of a Schelling-Steiner dogmantism."

== The war years and the rebuilding of the Waldorf schools ==
Tautz experienced the years of war as a nightmare and decided on a vocation as educator. "In living and suffering through the events of the time it became clear to me that Europe would become a question of education after the war which would prepare the foundations for a society based on human dignity," is what he wrote in his autobiographical sketch. So he went on to complete his teacher's certificate in Marburg.

After the war had turned into a world war with the entry of the United States, he was conscripted once again, was declared to be "not usable for war" and assigned clerical duties in the transport division in Cologne. Here he experienced the carpet bombing attacks and resulting conflagrations. In 1943 he was transferred to Lemberg in Ukraine, where he joined his superior officer, an anthroposophist, in studying Rudolf Steiner's book on self-education How to Attain Knowledge of Higher Worlds. During the retreat he felt secure without any weapon.

After the German capitulation, Tautz was imprisoned variously by the Czechs, Americans and Russians but managed to escape in the summer of 1945 back to his family in Bad Boll. He was soon approached by Erich Gabert in Stuttgart to join the Waldorf School that was about to be opened as its German and History teacher. On 1 November 1945 he stood before his first 9th grade at the Free Waldorf School, Uhlandshöhe. Shortly thereafter he met his future wife, who had also completed her PhD. Together they raised three sons.

== Meeting with Walter Johannes Stein ==
Soon Johannes Tautz decided to look up his "predecessor", the first history teacher at the Waldorf School, Walter Johannes Stein. In the introduction to his biography of Stein, Tautz writes, "In August 1951 the first meeting took place in London. Stein, who held close to three hundred lectures per year, had made several days available for our discussions and readily answered my questions." During the period of his meeting Stein in London, he also met with the previous Royal Air Force officer who had commanded that attack on Cologne.

The conversations with Stein provided an orientation and inspiration for all of his further work as a teacher, lecturer and writer; in his lecturing work at national and international conferences and in the "Hague Circle", a coordinating international group of Waldorf teachers. He likewise received particular guidance from Emil Bock regarding a Christological view of world history and from Jürgen von Grone about the destiny of Germany and in particular to the figure of Helmuth von Moltke.

After a heart attack in 1974, Tautz had to end his activities as a teacher. From then on he devoted himself to publishing, counselling and work in adult education.

== Researching National Socialism, Education and Helmuth von Moltke ==
In 1966 Tautz held three lectures about the spiritual background to National Socialism, which later appeared in print under the title Attack of the Enemy: The Occult Inspiration behind Adolf Hitler and the Nazis in 1976. In it he looks at a number of personalities connected with questionable occult practices with whom leading Nazis had been close during the time of the movement's growth. In 1979 he edited a collection of biographical portraits together with Gisbert Husemann of the circle of founding Waldorf teachers around Rudolf Steiner.

Together with a young friend, Thomas Meyer, he visited the daughter of Walter Johannes Stein, Clarissa Johanna Muller, in Ireland where she was living in order to look through her father's literary estate. They found the typescript of Stein's dissertation annotated by Rudolf Steiner, letters and meditations of Steiner for Stein, his mother and for his brother, who fell in a mysterious manner in World War I. Letters and notes of Ludwig Polzer-Hoditz, Eliza von Moltke, Ita Wegman, D.N Dunlop and many other personalities were discovered and formed the basis of Tautz's biography of Stein in 1989

In 1993 he initiated the editing of a collection of documents that up to this time had been privately circulated and were only partially known: Rudolf Steiner's letters and notes to Eliza von Moltke together with the post mortem communications and the letters of Helmuth von Moltke himself. The decision to publish these was to prevent or anticipate a partial publication without an appropriate commentary on the subject that had been announced. A previous instance of this content being used had been in the book The Spear of Destiny by Trevor Ravenscroft which, in the opinion of Tautz had been written "without the necessary protection of background knowledge for the deeply-penetrant and difficult to understand material."

His last publication Lehrerbewusstsein im 20. Jahrhundert – Erlebtes und Erkanntes, (The consciousness of the teacher in the twentieth century - Experiences and insights) appeared in 1995. Besides an autobiographic sketch it outlined a reflection of the entire past of the schools movement from 1919 onwards with short portraits of its leading personalities. Finally it elaborates on the three challenges facing every educator who works in the sense of the new understanding of the human being: Wakeful awareness of the spirit of the time; Responsibility towards one's historical conscience and the deepening of anthroposophical knowledge through meditative practice.

== Selected works ==
- Attack of the Enemy: The Occult Inspiration behind Adolf Hitler and the Nazis Temple Lodge Publishing; Reprint edition (October 1, 2014) ISBN 978-1906999711
- Der Lehrerkreis um Rudolf Steiner in der ersten Waldorfschule (mit Gisbert Husemann), Vlg. Freies Geistesleben, Stuttgart 1979 ISBN 978-3772506697
- W. J. Stein: A Biography, translated by John M. Wood Temple Lodge Publishing March 10, 2015 ISBN 978-1906999766
- Mankind At the Threshold: The Apocalyptic Language of This Century, translated by Marie St. Goar The Waldorf Institute 1983 ASIN B000FL07M0
- Light for the New Millennium: Rudolf Steiner's Association with Helmuth and Eliza Von Moltke: Letters, Documents and After-Death Communications by T. H. Meyer (Editor) Rudolf Steiner Press; November 1998 ISBN 978-1855840515
- Lehrerbewußtsein im 20. Jahrhundert, Vlg. am Goetheanum, Dornach 1995 ISBN 978-3723507476
