= Johannes Weyrauch =

German composer and cantor

Johannes Weyrauch (20 February 1897 – 1 May 1977) was a German composer and cantor.

== Life ==
=== Childhood ===
Weyrauch was born on 20 February 1897 in Leipzig. His mother, Maria Große, who had received a thorough musical education and worked in several cantor houses, introduced her son to sacred music at an early age. His father, Friedrich Louis Weyrauch, was a merchant by profession and was able to finance his son's attendance of the König-Albert-Gymnasium. Through his stepbrother (from his father's first marriage), Weyrauch got in touch with the music of Richard Wagner, which had a decisive influence on his musical life:

My brother sent me into the Ring when I was 14 years old - with the success that I became Wagner mad. A pedagogical, irreparable mistake, because since that time I have had no proper relationship with most operas.

Parallel to his schooling at the Gymnasium, Weyrauch became a pupil of Helene Caspar, a music teacher and writer known around the turn of the 19th and 20th centuries, who introduced him to the literature of the First Viennese School and that of Johann Sebastian Bach. In addition to these lessons, the Gewandhaus member Ernst Nissen gave him violin lessons. After ten years of working with Helene Caspar, she realized that she could no longer teach her talented student anything, so she arranged for him to be taught privately by Curt Beilschmidt, who taught theory and piano at the Leipzig Conservatory.

When Weyrauch took his Abitur in 1916, it was not possible for him to begin studying music immediately, as he was drafted that same summer and, after training as a machine-gunner, was ordered to serve on the Western Front. After the end of the war, the now 21-year-old returned to Leipzig and realized his plan to study music at the Leipzig Conservatory.

=== Study period ===
Weyrauch chose piano as his main subject with the indication to change to the organ later. The lessons were given to him by Robert Teichmüller; the music theory teacher was Otto Wittenbacher. Weyrauch took composition lessons with Stephan Krehl, from whose school famous musicians like Rudolf Mauersberger emerged. However, Weyrauch c0hanged composition teachers during the course of his studies and found in Sigfrid Karg-Elert a competent musical personality who appealed to him greatly. Karg-Elert's musical language was initially oriented towards late romantic sounds, but he also mixed these with impressionistic aspirations of Claude Debussy and the sound world of an Alexander Scriabin. In addition to practical and theoretical music studies, Weyrauch also attended musicological lectures and exercises with Hugo Riemann, Hermann Abert and Arnold Schering. In addition to Karg-Elerts polarity theory, Riemann's function theory had a great influence on Weyrauch's first works. In 1922 Weyrauch finished his studies at the Leipzig Conservatory and followed a call to Erlangen, where Wilhelm Becking had established a seminar for musicology. Becking persuaded Weyrauch to write a dissertation with the topic: Der sinfonische Aufbau bei Anton Bruckner, but he did not finish this work. Weyrauch commented on this fact with the following words:

I didn't feel called to be a scientist, but rather a musical practitioner. My compositional urge was stronger than the scientific work.

=== Start-up ===
After abandoning his dissertation, Weyrauch returned to Leipzig and now had to consider how he was to make a living, since composing alone did not provide him with enough money to live on. On the recommendation of his former piano teacher Robert Teichmüller, Weyrauch was able to accept a position as a lecturer at the Musikverlag Litolff in Braunschweig in 1923. However, he did not devote his full attention to the position, as he was composing during working hours, which led to a disagreement with the chief editor. As a result, Weyrauch quit the position and returned to Leipzig. To secure his livelihood, he gave private piano lessons. One year later Weyrauch married Maria Henriette Luise Winter, who was almost 11 years older than him.

In the same year, Weyrauch gained insight into the ideas of the "Methode nach Schlaffhorst und Andersen" through the mediation of his wife. He came into personal contact with the founders, the singing teacher Clara Schlaffhorst and the piano teacher Hedwig Andersen, and received new impulses for his own vocal work. In addition, Weyrauch was inspired by the German Youth Movement and the Jugendmusikbewegung that emerged from it. Weyrauch was particularly impressed by the strong influence of the singing movement on Protestant church music, which led to a new discovery Heinrich Schütz' and the Volksliedes. Weyrauch had personal contact with the two leading figures of the singing movement - Walther Hensel, the founder of the "Finkensteiner Bund" and Fritz Jöde, the initiator of the Musicians' Guild. Inspired by the breathing school and the youth music movement, Weyrauch decided to become a music teacher at the Leipzig Volkshochschule. Together with Hans Mlynarczyk, he founded the "Arbeitsgemeinschaft für Musik" at the Volkshochschule. Tasks and goals, which were anchored in the spirit of the youth movement, were outlined as follows:

Each listener will develop musically on his own. Nothing is brought to him from the outside, something by talking about music, but everyone makes music himself, everyone feels and senses the basic forces and basic facts of all music.

With this proclamation, both founding members rebelled against the common concert business, because in their opinion a passive audience was only a "music consuming sham community". The work at the adult education centre led to Weyrauch establishing a choir which soon after its foundation gained nationwide recognition. With the help of Karg-Elert, his sphere of activity was expanded in 1929 with a teaching position for music theory at the State Conservatory in Leipzig, which he was only able to hold for a short time, however, as he had to be dismissed due to the dearth of funds.

=== Life under National Socialism ===
After losing this post, Weyrauch also lost his main job, as the National Socialists closed all adult education centers shortly after seizure of power in January 1933. Weyrauch's singing circle could only continue to exist if he placed himself under church supervision. By the end of the 1920s he had already begun to concentrate his practical work with the Singkreis as well as his compositional work on the field of church music. Thus the decision matured in him to become a cantor.

In 1934 Weyrauch began external organ studies at the Church Music Institute of the Leipzig Academy of Music with Friedrich Högner. Weyrauch had been taking private organ lessons with Günther Ramin since the mid-1920s (student of the Thomas organist Karl Straube). Högner and Ramin, for example, also trained Hugo Distler in Leipzig until he dropped out. In summer 1935 he passed the church music C-examination and took over the part-time position of cantor at the Heilandskirche in Leipzig.

Shortly before the war, Weyrauch passed the B-examination for church musicians, but he had to leave the cantor's office inactive after the outbreak of the war, as he was called up in 1940 as a state gunner and assigned to guard the prisoners. Already after a few weeks he could take up the office of cantor again - now at the Leipziger Lutherkirche, because he was released into the reserve. Towards the end of the war, Weyrauch had to resume his military service and was taken to the Eastern Front in Poland after radio engineering training. He no longer had to intervene in the war events, because the German troops were already on the retreat. After a six-month war captivity in Schwedt, Weyrauch was able to return to Leipzig, where he resumed his position as cantor and became a member of the younger Thomanerchor at the request of Thomaskantor Günther Ramin voice training. However, Weyrauch soon gave up the position due to an excessive workload.

=== Turning to church music ===
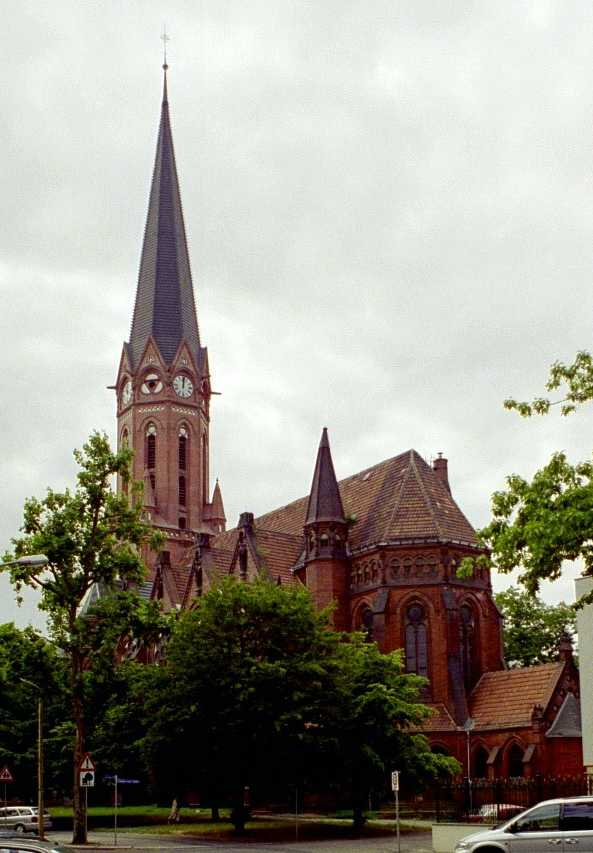
Heilandskirche in Leipzig-Plagwitz

In October 1946 Weyrauch was appointed as a lecturer in composition and music theory at the rebuilt Leipzig Academy of Music, which was renamed the Mendelssohn Academy. Among his students were Volker Bräutigam, Diethard Hellmann, Lorenz Stolzenbach and Siegfried Thiele. Dwindling membership in the churches due to the anti-church attitude of the time prompted Weyrauch to compose simpler works which took into account the reduced size of church choirs. Sometimes he composed only 2- or 3-voice movements or even one-voice vocal works with organ accompaniment.

In 1951 Weyrauch again took up the position of cantor at the Heilandskirche in Leipzig-Plagwitz and held this position until his voluntary retirement in 1961. He made his position as cantor at the Heilandskirche available to enable his student Volker Bräutigam to start his professional life immediately. While it was still easy to give up this office, the following year the emeritus weighed far more heavily. Weyrauch was to continue teaching composition and theory for another five years at the Leipzig Academy of Music. After his dismissal as professor, he resigned from the composition association of the GDR, as he had not received any respect or support. 1962 was also the year in which Weyrauch became a member of The Christian Community without leaving the Evangelical Church. In Weyrauch's opinion, the "act of consecration of man to the Christian Community is [the] only service in the 20th century" that he could accept.

=== Travel age and last years of life ===
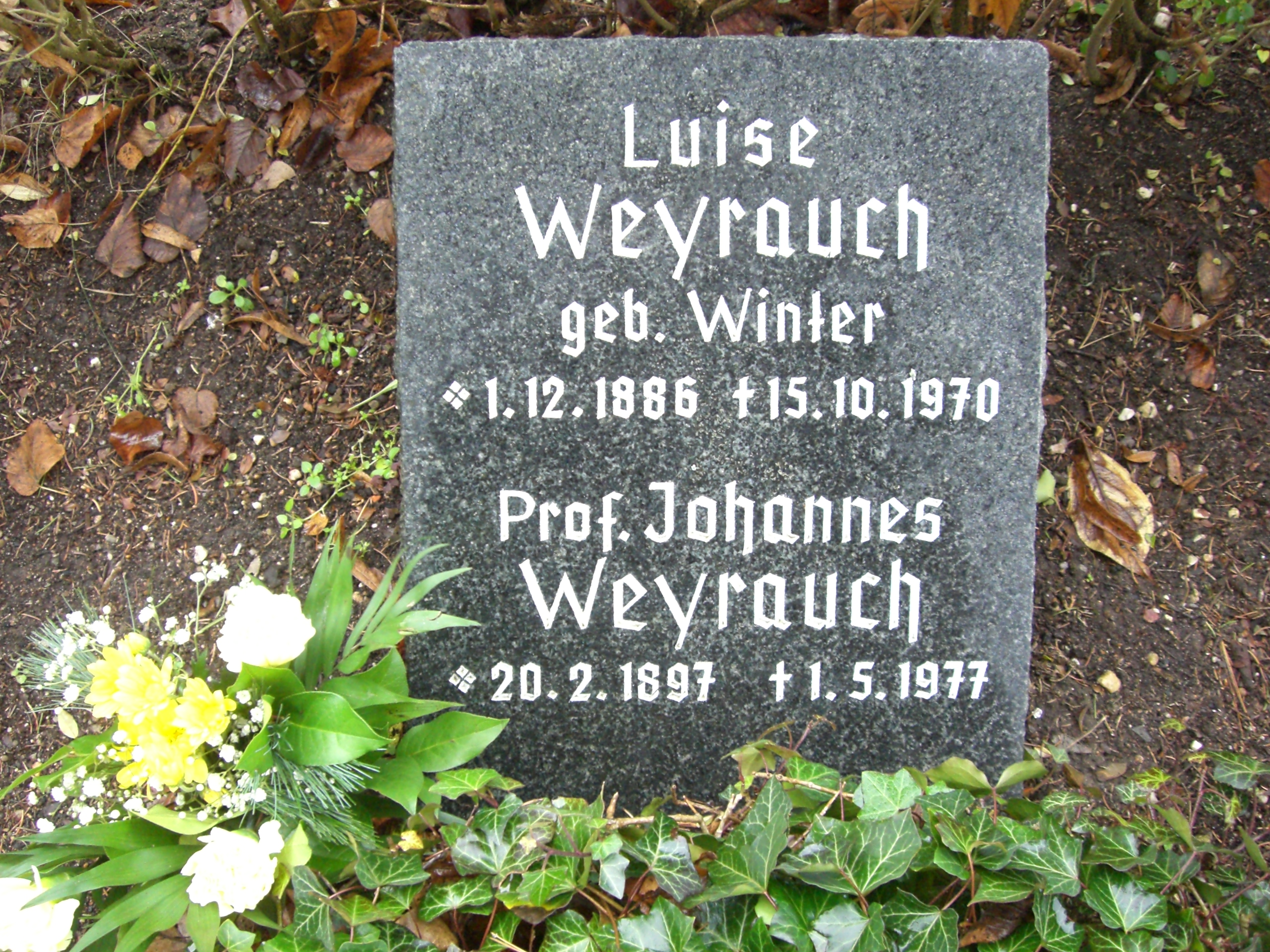
Grave at the cemetery of Gundorf

The retirement age opened up completely new travel opportunities for GDR citizens. Contacts to West German publishing houses were established and friends all over Germany were visited. In 1967 Weyrauch finally ended his teaching activities at the Academy of Music. Also in this year Weyrauch wrote his "Musical Testament", which contains 15 aphoristic thoughts and represents the essence of his compositional work.

The care of his wife, who was already almost blind and in need of care, did not allow Weyrauch to devote himself to composing. The years of care now also led to states of exhaustion and vegetative complaints. At the beginning of 1970 he was admitted to a hospital in Leipzig, but recovered again. On 15 October 1970 his wife Luise died, which is why he only composed a little. In 1972 he moved to a retirement home. After his 80th birthday in 1977, a rapid decline of his physical and mental powers began. Weyrauch died on 1 May 1977 at the age of 80 and was buried at Gundorf Cemetery (near Leipzig).

The place at the community centre in Böhlitz-Ehrenberg, in the district Gundorf of this municipality he lived for several decades, was renamed in his honour "Johannes-Weyrauch-Platz".

== Basic artistic attitude and musical influences ==
The author of Johannes Weyrauch's biography (Wolfgang Orf) describes the basic musical attitude in this way

Weyrauch's biography makes it easy to see that there is an artistic-spiritual relationship between his basic Christian attitude and his work that is never abandoned. This relationship is particularly expressed through the reflection on certain categories of values: clarity, avoidance of all superfluous things and the use of economical and simple musical means. His tonal language seems conventional, it is not rich in surprising turns. He does not work towards moods, gives no impressions and renounces tonal opulence in favour of a clear, transparent sound. Extensive experiments are as alien to his music as one-sided musical driving forces, if one disregards some works from his early creative period. In that Weyrauch's music is simple, avoids excessive loudness, effect, sound voluptuousness and voluptuousness, it possesses a high degree of clarity, comprehensibility and expressiveness. The simplicity and deliberate simplicity of the musical style, especially in the late works, is by no means a lack of craftsmanship, but the result of a long personal and thus also artistic maturation period.

Weyrauch himself speaks of four stages of development that characterize his work. Artistically, there are no hard breaks or extreme reorientations, which is why the style periods flow into each other and have developed naturally. The stylistic periodicity is structured as follows:

1st period from 1920 to 1925: Expressive style
2nd period from 1926 to 1946: Simplified, moderate style
3rd period from 1947 to 1958: Paupertät style
4th period from 1959 to 1977: style of mirrored intellectual ideas

The expressive style of the early phase is influenced by his Leipzig teachers, who felt committed to the music of the 19th century and had a central role model in Max Reger. But not only Reger, but also Alexander Scriabin served Weyrauch - especially in the field of (extended) harmonics and counterpoint - as an ideal in this period. The Youth music movement functioned as a counterpart to the music of the 19th century, since it dismissed it as light music or empty, virtuoso performance music and sought its salvation in the music of the "Old Masters" - for example Heinrich Schütz, but also Johann Sebastian Bach - and their genres and forms. Their endeavour was to make music accessible and practise it together and to overcome the separation between the (anonymous) audience and the performing musicians. Due to the return to (pre)baroque compositional techniques, the horizontal, harmonic compositional thinking of the 19th century was replaced by a linear voice leading, a process that can also be traced in Weyrauch's early compositions. The harmonically complex sound structures, as he was taught in the "Leipzig School", are taken back by the contact with the singing movement in his second creative period and replaced by clear chords with tonal roots. In the third creative period, the simplifying tendencies intensify, resulting in a further reduction in the complexity of the melodic structure, which is why Weyrauch himself coined the word "Paupertät style" for his music of this period. Archaic elements such as motifs influenced by Gregorian chant or free-flowing melodies that are not subordinated to a rigid bar scheme characterize the compositions. In addition to the stylistic reorientation, the anti-Christian basic attitude promoted in the GDR also led to a loss of members in the churches, which is why Weyrauch wrote simple movements for small ensembles for practical reasons. He described his last creative period as a "style of mirrored spiritual ideas", in which he dispensed with decorative elements in the individual voices in favour of clear diction in the overall arrangement of the works. The tonal language, which becomes harsher and more brittle, deliberately dispenses with "musical beauty" and places the meditative element more strongly in the foreground. This last style period represents a culmination of all compositional styles.

As was already evident in the classification of the stylistic periods of Weyrauch, various compositional currents flow into his oeuvre. However, the surroundings of Leipzig with its great names such as Johann Sebastian Bach, Felix Mendelssohn Bartholdy, Robert Schumann and Max Reger also exerted an obligatory influence. A central course was already set after the first compositions, as the decision against the avant-garde was made here. The four piano pieces (WeyWV 8), which take up the tonal language of Scriabin, could have become Weyrauch's foundation stone in overcoming tonality. But instead of following this widespread trend, a conscious departure from this method of composition was made in favour of a turn towards a traditional musical language that is quiet, meditative and free of all obtrusiveness and externalities.

Three worldviews - anthroposophy, The Christian Community and the Berneuchen Movement - also determined Weyrauch's essence and work. The spiritual worldview of anthroposophy, founded by Rudolf Steiner, who was interested in Weyrauch as a silent observer, seeks an individual, yet systematic approach to phenomena of the supersensible world. Inspired by this doctrine, but nevertheless understood as an independent religious community, the Christian Community, which was founded by theologians under the guidance of Friedrich Rittelmeyer and with the help of Rudolf Steiner, has become apparent. The Berneuchener Kreis, which came into being around 1920, was an evangelical movement whose aim was to reform the church and to resacralize everyday life.

During his almost sixty-year creative period, Weyrauch left behind an extensive œuvre of 100 operas, with a focus on Musica sacra. In addition to music for wind and string instruments, compositions for organ dominate the instrumental music. Numerous meditations, chorale preludes and partitas to church songs testify to Weyrauch's basic religious attitude. In the field of vocal music, too, a clear predominance of sacred music can be observed; here, the preference for choral music is conspicuous, while solo works are hardly to be found. Above all motets, introits and cantatas to sacred or biblical texts dominate the picture, whereas large forms such as oratorios, masses or passions are almost completely absent.

All the organ works have been recorded by the cantor Michael Vetter on a total of three CDs. In contrast, only one CD with selected vocal works exists, which was recorded by the Leipzig Vocal Ensemble under the direction of the Thomaskantor Georg Christoph Biller in cooperation with the Central German Chamber Orchestra. Biller, who was still able to experience Weyrauch personally, was commissioned by the latter shortly before his death to maintain and perform his works. Many works have been published by various publishing houses, including the Musikverlag Joachim Kaschta, Carus-Verlag and Breitkopf & Härtel.

== Systematic Catalogue of Works ==
=== Instrumental music ===
==== Music for chamber orchestra ====
- Wie es euch gefällt WeyWV 17 Eine kleine Programm-Musik in sechs Blitzlichtern 2V, Vc, Klav, Schreib- und Nähmaschine, Staubsauger
- Hymnus für 13 Bratschen WeyWV 19a Solo-Va, drei 4stg Va-Chöre
- Musik zum Märchen Der Kaiser und die Nachtigall WeyWV 28b Fl, 2V, Va, Vc, Kb, Klav, Solo-St, Chor SATB
- Divertimento für Streichorchester WeyWV 71 (Streichquartett II mit beigefügtem Kb) 2V, Va, Vc, Kb
- Doppelkonzert für Flöte, Oboe und Streichorchester WeyWV 85 Fl, Ob, 2V, Va, Vc, Kb
- Sonatina für Streichorchester WeyWV 88 2V, Va, Vc, Kb

==== Chamber music ====
Wind Instruments
- Praeambulum und Fughetta WeyWV 23 4BlFl
- Kanzona B-Dur WeyWV 36 Fl, V, Klav
- Vier Posaunenchöre WeyWV 68a 3–4 Pos

Intrada und Choral über Jesu, meine Freude 4 Pos
Intrada und Choral über Auf meinen lieben Gott 3 Pos
Intrada und Choral über Aus tiefer Not schrei ich zu dir 4 Pos
Intrada und Choral über Befiehl du deine Wege 4 Pos

- Sieben Etüden für Flöte WeyWV 70d Fl
- Cantus I und II WeyWV 75 Vc (o Fl o Va), Tastinstr
- Eine kleine Serenade WeyWV 86a Fl, Va
- Triptychon WeyWV 92b Fl, V, Vc
- Eine kleine Spielmusik (flute quartet) WeyWV 95 Fl, V, Va, Vc
- Musik zur Menschenweihehandlung WeyWV 98 Fl
- Cantilene WeyWV 99 Fl, Klav

Strings

Duos
- Sonate in H WeyWV 16 V, Klav
- Passionsonate über: »Herzliebster Jesu, was hast du verbrochen« WeyWV 21 Va (o Vc), Tastinstr
- Heitere Sonatina in B WeyWV 24b V, Klav (o Cemb)
- Partita über: All mein Gedanken, die ich hab WeyWV 43 V, Klav
- Drei Trauungsmusiken WeyWV 65 Streichinstr, Org

Allein Gott in der Höh V, Org (o Harm o Klav)
Herr Jesu Christ, dich zu uns wend V, Org
Vater unser im Himmelreich Vc, Org

- Cantus I und II WeyWV 75 Vc (o Fl o Va), Tastinstr
- Eine kleine Serenade WeyWV 86a Fl, Va

Trios
- Eine kleine Porzellansuite (Eine lustige Serenade) WeyWV 7 2V, Va
- Triosonate WeyWV 24a V, Va, Vc
- Kanzona B-Dur WeyWV 36 Fl, V, Klav
- 2 kleine Musiken zu Goethes Märchen von der grünen Schlange und der schönen Lilie WeyWV 46a 3V
- Triptychon WeyWV 92b Fl, V, Vc

Quartets
- Streichquartett No.1 in einem Satz d-Moll WeyWV 6a 2V, Va, Vc
- Streichquartett in einem Satz h-Moll [No.2] WeyWV 11a 2V, Va, Vc
- Der Brautgruß zum 8. Oktober 1924 WeyWV 11b 2V, Va, Vc
- Streichquartett (No.3) Fragment WeyWV 12c 2V, Va, Vc
- Streichquartett I in H WeyWV 67 2V, Va, Vc
- Streichquartett II »Kaffeequartett« WeyWV 71 2V, Va, Vc
- Streichquartett III WeyWV 73 2V, Va, Vc
- Streichquartett IV WeyWV 83 2V, Va, Vc
- Eine kleine Spielmusik (Flötenquartett) WeyWV 95 Fl, V, Va, Vc

Piano music

Piano Solo
- Introduktion, Passacaglia und Fuge für 2 Klaviere WeyWV 1 2Klav
- 6 Klavierstücke (Zyklisch) WeyWV 4 Klav
- Klaviersonate in H WeyWV 5 Klav
- 4 Klavierstücke (Zyklisch) WeyWV 8 Klav
- Partita in G-Dur WeyWV 13 Klav
- Partita in D für Cembalo oder Klavier WeyWV 31a Cemb (o Klav)
- Kleine Klaviermusik WeyWV 42 Klav
- Sonate in F für Klavier WeyWV 69 Klav
- Fünf kleine Klavierstücke WeyWV 92a Klav
- Musik für Tasteninstrument WeyWV 97 Tastinstr (o Str)

Piano with other instruments
- Sonate in H WeyWV 16 V, Klav
- Passionsonate über: Herzliebster Jesu, was hast du verbrochen WeyWV 21 Va (o Vc), Tastinstr
- Heitere Sonatina in B WeyWV 24b V, Klav (o Cemb)
- Kanzona B-Dur WeyWV 36 Fl, V, Klav
- Partita über: All mein Gedanken, die ich hab WeyWV 43 V, Klav
- Cantus I und II WeyWV 75 Vc (o Fl o Va), Tastinstr
- Cantilene WeyWV 99 Fl, Klav

Organ music
- Präludium, Aria e Fuga für Orgel WeyWV 27a Org
- Sieben Partiten zum Kirchenjahr WeyWV 27b Org

Advent: O Heiland, reiß die Himmel auf
Weihnachten: Singet frisch und wohlgemut
Passion: Jesu, deine Passion will ich jetzt bedenken
Ostern: Heut triumphieret Gottes Sohn
Pfingsten: Nun bitten wir den heilgen Geist
Michaelis: Unüberwindlich starker Held
Endzeit: Ich weiß ein lieblich Engelspiel

- Six chorale preludes WeyWV 32b Org

Die helle Sonn leucht jetzt herfür
Es sind doch selig, alle die
Herzlich lieb hab’ ich dich, o Herr
Kommt her zu mir, spricht Gottes Sohn
O Mensch, bewein dein Sünde groß
Valet will ich dir geben

- Fuga c-Moll WeyWV 33b Org
- Missa per Organum (Organ mass) WeyWV 40 Org
- Sonatine über den Choral Nun komm, der Heiden Heiland WeyWV 47 Org
- Zwei Orgelchoräle WeyWV 52a Org

Morgenglanz der Ewigkeit
Wir danken, Herr, für Brot und Kleid

- Neun Choralvorspiele WeyWV 53 Org

Aus tiefster Not ruf ich zu dir
Du großer Schmerzensmann
Durch Adams Fall
Es wolle Gott uns gnädig sein
Jesu, meine Freude
Mitten wir im Leben sind
Nun freut euch
Nun lob mein Seel
Wie schön leucht uns

- Orgelsonate in E WeyWV 59 Org
- Taufmusik WeyWV 68b Org (Positiv)
- Missa parvula Kleine Messe WeyWV 74 (Org) Positiv
- Verleih uns Frieden gnädiglich WeyWV 78 Positiv (Org)
- Kleine Partita in D (Vier Bagatellen) WeyWV 80 Positiv
- Gang durch das christliche Jahr 12 Meditationen zum Eingang und Beschluss von Gottesdiensten der christlichen Kirche WeyWV 90 Positiv (Org); includes:

Musik zur Pfingst- und Michaeliszeit WeyWV 76
Musik zur Trinitatiszeit WeyWV 77
Musik zur Osterzeit WeyWV 87

=== Vocal music ===
==== Sacred music ====
Masses
- Messe in C WeyWV 37 4–5stg gem. Chor
- Missa pauperum WeyWV 49 Chor SAM, (Str ad lib,) Org, (Gemeinde)

Passion
- Kleine Passion nach dem Evangelium des Johannes WeyWV 64 Chor SAM, Chorsoli, (Str ad lib,) Org

Motets
- Die Liebe höret nimmer auf Motette nach Worten der heiligen Schrift WeyWV 10a Chor SATB
- Befiehl du deine Wege WeyWV 34 Chor SATB, Bar-Solo (o MezzoS)
- Herr Christ, der einig Gotts Sohn Christi Gespräch mit Nikodemus (Evangelienmotette) WeyWV 44 1–5stg gem. Chor
- Kleine Motette [Evangelienspruch] Will mir jemand nachfolgen WeyWV 48b,2 2stg Chor, Org
- Das große Abendmahl Selig ist, der das Brot ißt (Evangelienmotette) WeyWV 60 5stg gem. Chor
- Der Gang nach Emmaus Der zuvor in sterbliche Gestalt sich kleidete (Evangelienmotette) WeyWV 72 1–6stg Chor, 2 Einzelst, Org
- Die Verklärung Christi Unser Herr Jesus Christus (Evangelienmotette) WeyWV 84 1–6stg Chor

Introit
- Lobet den Herrn alle Heiden Introitus für den 3. Sonntag p. Epiphanias WeyWV 63b Chor SATB
- Frohlocket mit Händen alle Völker Introitus für den 3. Sonntag p. Epiphanias WeyWV 70c,1 Chor SAM
- Das Volk, so im Finstern wandelt Introitus für die Adventszeit WeyWV 70c,2 Chor SATB
- Herr, neige deine Ohren Introitus für den 15.–18. Sonntag nach Trinitatis und für den Tag der Konfirmation WeyWV 70c,3 Chor SATB
- Gott, dem ewigen Könige Introitus für das Trinitatisfest – WeyWV 70c,4 Chor SATB
- Siehe, der Herr wird kommen mit Feuer Introitus für den 24. bis letzten Sonntag p. Trinitatis WeyWV 70c,5 Chor SATB
- Der Herr ward gehorsam bis zum Tod Introitus für die Sonntage Judica bis Karfreitag WeyWV 70c,6 Chor SAM

Cantatas
- Eine Osterkantate: An dem ersten Tage der Woche WeyWV 14a Chor SATB, 2 Clar, Str, Org, (Trp, Pos ad lib)
- Auferstehungsmusik WeyWV 33a Soli, Chor SATB, 2 Fl, Str, Org
- Auf das Christfest: Armselig ist’s zu Bethlehem WeyWV 54a A-Solo (o 1stg Frauenchor, Chor SAM, Org)
- Lasset uns mit Jesu ziehen WeyWV 58,1 1stg Chor, Einzelst, Org (o Fl, Str)
- Christe, du Beistand deiner Kreuzgemeinde WeyWV 58,2 1stg Chor, Einzelst, Org (o Str)
- Eine Kantate vom Reich Gottes Christus sprach: Mein Reich ist nicht von dieser Welt WeyWV 91 1–5stg gem. Chor, Str, Org
- Eine Kantate von der Liebe Wenn ich mit Menschen- und mit Engelszungen redete WeyWV 93a 1–5stg gem. Chor, Str, Org

Smaller sacred compositions

Mixed choir a cappella
- Zeit ist wie Ewigkeit WeyWV 20a Chor SATB
- Christ fuhr gen Himmel, was sandt er uns hernieder? WeyWV 25a Chor SAM
- Altes fränkisches Weihnachtslied: Lieb Nachtigal, wach auf WeyWV 25b Chor SATB (Str)
- Wenn mein Stündlein vorhanden ist WeyWV 26c,3 Chor SAM (Org)
- Es ist ein Schnitter WeyWV 26c,4 Chor SATB
- St.-Johannis-Lied: Wir wollen sing'n ein Lobgesang WeyWV 28a Chor SAM
- Unüberwindlich starker Held WeyWV 28c,1 Chor SATB
- Drei Weihnachtslieder WeyWV 30 Chor SAM
- Aller Augen warten auf dich Small motet on the harvest festival WeyWV 32c,1 2stg Chor
- O König, Jesu Christe Kleine Liedkantate WeyWV 31b,3
- Laßt uns preisen WeyWV 31b,4 1stg Chor (o gem. Chor a cappella)
- Lobt Gott, ihr frommen Christen WeyWV 46c,2 Chor SATB
- Selig sind die Toten WeyWV 48b,3 2stg Chor (o 2 Einzelst)
- Nun lob, mein Seel, den Herren WeyWV 50b 5stg Chor
- Gelobet seist du, Jesu Christ WeyWV 55,1 2stg Chor
- Herr Christ, der einig Gott's Sohn WeyWV 55,2 Chor SAM
- Lobt Gott, den Herrn, ihr Heiden all WeyWV 55,3 2stg Chor
- Vom Himmel kam der Engel Schar WeyWV 55,5 2stg Chor
- Christlied WeyWV 56a,1 Chor SATB
- Der Heiland ist geboren WeyWV 56a,2 Chor SAM
- Lieb Nachtigall, wach auf! WeyWV 56a,3 Chor SAM
- Zwei Chöre WeyWV 62

Das Wort geht vom Vater aus Chor SAM
Christ lag in Todesbanden 2stg gem. Chor

- Majästetisch Wesen möcht ich recht dich preisen WeyWV 63a 5stg gem. Chor
- Die Herrlichkeit der Erden WeyWV 79 Chor SATB (Org) o Einzelst und Org
- Allein den Betern kann es noch gelingen WeyWV 89a Chor SATB (Org o Pos)

Mixed choir with instruments
- Zeit ist wie Ewigkeit WeyWV 20a,2 Chor SATB, Ansinger, Org
- Ade ihr Lieben WeyWV 26c,2 2stg Chor, Org
- Wenn mein Stündlein vorhanden ist WeyWV 26c,3 Chor SAM (Org)
- Wach auf, wach auf Kleine Choralkantate (Reformationsfest) WeyWV 28c,2 2stg Chor, Org (Gemeindegesang)
- Drei "Neue Lieder" WeyWV 28d Chor SATB, Org

Deutschland stirbt nicht. "Nichts kann uns rauben Liebe und Glauben"
Neujahrslied: Der du die Zeit in Händen hast
Wer kann der Treu vergessen

- Ach lieder Herre Jesu Christ WeyWV 48b,1 2stg Chor (o 2 Einzelst), Org
- Kleine Motette (Evangelienspruch): Will mir jemand nachfolgen WeyWV 48b,2 2stg Chor, Org

Unanimous choirs a cappella
- Die Herrlichkeit der Erden WeyWV 26c,1 1stg Chor
- Und alles, was ihr tut WeyWV 31b,2 1-3stg Chor

Monophonic choirs with instruments
- Nun danket all' und bringet Ehr WeyWV 18b 1stg Chor, Org
- Kyrie, fons bonitatis WeyWV 29 mittl St, Tastinst (o Str) / 1stg Chor, Org (o Str)
- Laßt uns preisen WeyWV 31b,4 1stg Chor, Org (o gem Chor)
- Laß Herr, die geschieden WeyWV 32c,2 1stg Chor, Org / 2stg Kinder- (o Frauen-)chor
- Hochzeitsmusik WeyWV 45 1stg Frauen- (o Kinder-)chor, Fl, V, Org / 1stg Chor, Org
- O heiliger Geist WeyWV 50a 1stg Chor (o Solost), Org
- Jesus Christus, unser Heiland WeyWV 54b, 1stg Chor, Org
- Lasset uns mit Jesu ziehen WeyWV 58,1 1stg Chor, Einzelst, Org (o Fl, Str)
- Christe, du Beistand deiner Kreuzgemeinde WeyWV 58,2 1stg Chor, Einzelst, Org (o Str)

Choir of equal voices
- Maria durch ein Dornwald ging WeyWV 14b 3stg Frauen- (o Kinder-)chor (3V)
- Zeit ist wie Ewigkeit WeyWV 20a,3 2stg Kinder- (o Frauen-)chor, 2V, Ansinger, Org
- Zeit ist wie Ewigkeit WeyWV 20a,3 2stg Kinder- (o Frauen-)chor, 2Blfl, Ansinger, Org
- Das walte Gott WeyWV 31b,1 2stg Kinderchor (o 2 Einzelst), Org
- Laß Herr, die geschieden WeyWV 32c,2 1stg Chor und Org o 2stg Kinder- (o Frauen-)chor
- Sieben Choralsätze WeyWV 46b 2-3 gleiche St
- Fröhlich wir nun fangen alle an 46c,1 2-3 gleiche St
- Nun freut euch, liebe Christen gmein WeyWV 55,4 2stg Frauenchor
- Vier Chöre WeyWV 61 1stg Kinder- (o Frauen-)chor, Org

Wohl denen, die da wandeln
Ich singe dir mit Herz und Mund
Lobt Gott, den Herrn der Herrlichkeit
Ich weiß ein lieblich Engelspiel

Individual Singing
- Weihnachts-Wiegenlied: Schlafe kleines Jesulein WeyWV 14c Einzelst, V
- Im Himmelreich ein Haus steht WeyWV 19b mittl St, Tast-Instr (o Str)
- Euch ist heute der Heiland geboren Kantate nach Worten der »Weihnachtskantilene« des Matthias Claudius WeyWV 26b 2 mittl St, Org
- Kyrie, Gott Vater in Ewigkeit WeyWV 29 mittl St, Tast-Instr (o Str) / 1stg Chor, Org (o Str)
- Der 150. Psalm: Halleluja. Lobet den Herrn WeyWV 38 Singst, Org
- Magnificat WeyWV 41 Singst, Chor SATB, Org
- Ach lieber Herre Jesu Christ WeyWV 48b,1 2stg Chor (o 2 Einzelst), Org
- Selig sind die Toten WeyWV 48b,3 2stg Chor (o 2 Einzelst)
- Zwei geistliche Lieder WeyWV 57 Einzelst, Fl, V, Va

Da Jesus in den Garten ging
In stiller Nacht

- Selig sind die Toten WeyWV 79 Chor SATB (Org) / Einzelst, Org

==== Secular music ====
Choir
- Gleichnis: "Und unser Weg ist wie des Baumes Schreiten" WeyWV 9 4–8stg gem. Chor
- Eine Freizeit-Kantate: "Laßt uns loben diesen Tag" WeyWV 22 Chor SAM, Str, Org
- Ode an die Musik: "Von allen ginstlichen Genissen" Sächsische Kantate nach J. H. Schein WeyWV 51 Männerchor
- Zwei Chorlieder WeyWV 94 Chor SAM

All mein Gedanken, die ich hab
Weiß mir ein Blümlein blaue

- Endzeit Spruchgesang nach Worten von Romano Guardini WeyWV 96 1–3stg Choir (o Einzelst, 3 stg Chor), organ (or piano)

Individual Singing
- 5 Lieder für Alt (Baritone) WeyWV 2 A (o Bar), Klav
- 7 Lieder für Tenor (Sopran) und Klavier WeyWV 3 T (o S), Klav
- Ich hört' ein Glöcklein schlagen WeyWV 6b SAM (Chor), Klav
- Sonnenspiel: "Wiegenlieder spielt die Sonne" WeyWV 10b SAT, Klav
- Schließe mir die Augen beide WeyWV 10c mittl St, Klav
- Vier Lieder WeyWV 12a Singst, Klav
- Drei Lieder WeyWV 12b Singst, Klav
- Drei Lieder WeyWV 15 Singst, Klav
- Ein Maienlob: "Der edle Mai ist gekommen" WeyWV 18a mittl St, Klav
- Täglich zu singen: "Ich danke Gott und freue mich" WeyWV 20b Singst, Tastinstr
- Vier Lieder nach Worten von Matthias Claudius WeyWV 26a mittl St, Klav
- Drei Lieder WeyWV 32a mittl St, Klav
- Morgenstern-Zyklus: "Erdengang" Sechs Gesänge nach Chr. Morgenstern WeyWV 35 mittl St, Klav
- Zwei Weihnachtslieder WeyWV 39 Einzelst, Klav
- Gnade des Aufbruchs: "Viele machen sich auf" WeyWV 48a mittl St, Klav
- Vier Weihnachtslieder WeyWV 56b Singst, Klav
- Abendwolke: So stille ruht im Hafen WeyWV 70a mittl St, Klav
- Drei Lieder WeyWV 81 mittl St, Klav
- Morgensternlieder WeyWV 82 Singst, Klav
- Ein altes Liebeslied Minnekantate: "Du bist min" WeyWV 89b mittl St, Fl, Klav
- Leib, Seele und Geist: "Leise streichelt der Wind den Leib" WeyWV 93b mittl St, Klav

Canons
- Drei Kanons WeyWV 66 4Einzelst
- Wir haben nicht empfangen WeyWV 70b 4 Einzelst
- Wir singen immer mit Elan WeyWV 86b 3 Einzelst
- Habens Leben wir getrieben WeyWV 100 4 Einzelst

== Literature ==
- Georg Christoph Biller: Johannes Weyrauch – Festrede zur Benennung des Johannes-Weyrauch- Platzes in Böhlitz-Ehrenberg. Ms. 2001
- Diethard Hellmann: Musik des Wortes, in Musik und Kirche, 68, 1997
- Alfred Heuß: Auseinandersetzung über das Wesen der neuen Musik [Vier Klavierstücke. Zyklisch], in Zeitschrift für Musik. 9. 1923, H. 17
- Wolfgang Orf: Johannes Weyrauch. Ein Komponistenporträt. Leipzig: Krämer 2005
  - Die Johannespassion von Johannes Weyrauch, in Musik und Kirche, 42. 1972
  - Zusprüche. Ed. by Wolfgang Orf. Leipzig: Krämer 1997
  - Singen ist Wortverkündigung. Der Komponist Johannes Weyrauch und seine Tätigkeit als Lehrer an der Volkshochschule Leipzig in Leipziger Blätter, 31. 1997
  - Versuch über die Quellen des Spätschaffens von Johannes Weyrauch. (Two unprinted cantatas), in Festschrift zum 75. Geburtstag Johannes Weyrauchs. Leipzig 1972. Hschr. u. Mschr.
  - Verzeichnis der Werke Johannes Weyrauchs. Leipzig: Krämer 1997
- Ulrike Prahl: De altviool in de kerkmusiek. Bespreking van twee koraalbewerkingen voor altviool en orgel van Felicitas Kukuck en Johannes Weyrauch. Verhandeling ingediend tot het behalen van de Grad van Mester in de Musik. Vol. 1 and 2, Leuven: Hogeschol voor Wetenschap en Kunst 1997
- Johannes Weyrauch: Gedanken über zeitgenössische Kirchenmusik, in Die Union (Desden edition). 7 July 1954
  - Abriß meiner kompositorischen Arbeit. Ms. 1963
  - Musikalisches Testament. Leipzig: Krämer 1997

== Discography ==
=== Individual works on collective CDs ===
- Maria durch ein’ Dornwald ging für dreistimmigen Frauen-/Kinderchor WeyWV 14b

Thomanerchor Leipzig, Hans-Joachim Rotzsch
in Weihnachten mit dem Thomanerchor (Double-CD), Deutsche Schallplatten Berlin (Vertrieb: Ariola Hamburg), Bestell-Nr: DSB 2 008-2

- Ich steh an deiner Krippen hier for Solosoprano and Organ WeyWV deest

Filip Dames (Knabensolist), Stefan Kaden (Organ)
in Der Göttinger Knabenchor singt seine Weihnachtsmusik; Bestell-Nr: GK CD 1 (Vertrieb durch den Göttinger Knabenchor)

- Unüberwindlich starker Held Partita for Organ WeyWV 27b,6

Hartmut Haupt
in Orgeln in Thüringen – Jena II Parzifahl Verlag, Dornach, Bestell-Nr: CD 800 114-2

- Herr Christ, der einig Gotts Sohn "Christi Gespräch mit Nikodemus" Evangelienmotette für gemischten Chor WeyWV 44

Dresdner Kreuzchor, Gotthart Stier
in Romantische Chormusik Berlin Classics (Deutsche Schallplatten GmbH Berlin), Bestell-Nr: BC 1032-2

=== Complete CDs ===
- Johannes Weyrauch – Geistliche Vokalmusik

Adelheid Vogel (soprano), Volker Arndt (tenor), Matthias Weichert (bass), Kristiane Köbler (organ)
Mitteldeutsches Kammerorchester, Leipziger Vocalensemble, Georg Christoph Biller
Raumklang (Auslieferung Helikon), Bestell-Nr: RK 9504

- Johannes Weyrauch – 7 Partiten auf das Kirchenjahr

Michael Vetter (Traunstein) at the Julius Jahn & Sohn organ of the Michaeliskirche Pirna
Ambiente, Bestell-Nr: ACD 9703

- Johannes Weyrauch – Die freien Orgelwerke

Michael Vetter an der Rohlf-Orgel der Auferstehungskirche Traunstein
Ambiente, Bestell-Nr: ACD 9903

- Johannes Weyrauch: Orgelwerke Vol. 3

Michael Vetter an der Rohlf-Orgel der Auferstehungskirche Traunstein
Ambiente, Bestell-Nr: ACD-2010
