= Hermann Beckh =

German Tibetologist and prominent promoter of anthroposophy (1875–1937)

Hermann Beckh (4 May 1875, in Nuremberg – 1 March 1937, in Stuttgart) was a pioneering German Tibetologist and prominent promoter of anthroposophy.

== Biography ==
Hermann Beckh was born in Nuremberg to a factory owner, Eugen Beckh, and his wife Marie, née Seiler (died 1943). He had a sister some 12 years younger with whom he had a close friendship until she died in 1929.

Due to his unusual memory skills, he graduated from high school with excellent marks in 1893 and received a scholarship at the Munich Maximilianeum. Given his many interests and talents, he found the initial decision of field of study a difficult one; his peers encouraged him towards law. He completed his studies of law with a prizewinning thesis Die Beweislast nach dem Bürgerlichen Gesetzbuch (The Onus of Proof, from the Civil Law Code) and was employed as an assessor until 1899. It became clear to him that he was not made out to be a judge when he had to impose a fine on a poor married couple for stealing wood. He paid the couple's fine out of his own pocket and left his position.

He later took up the study of oriental languages, Indology, and Tibetology at the Christian-Albrechts-Universität at Kiel. In 1907, he received his doctorate at Humboldt-Universität at Berlin with a thesis on Kalidasa's poem Meghaduta. He received his final degree the following year with further work on this poem. He taught as a private tutor of the Tibetan language until 1921 and worked cataloguing Tibetan manuscripts at the Staatsbibliothek in Berlin.

In 1911, he met Rudolf Steiner and Friedrich Rittelmeyer, which led to his intensive study of Steiner's work. On Christmas Day, 1912, he became a member of the Anthroposophical Society.

In 1916, Beckh was drafted into military service, shortly after Sammlung Göschen published two volumes about the Buddha and his teachings. Next stationed in the Balkans, he was called to work in the Institut für Weltwirtschaft an der Universität Kiel (Kiel Institute for the World Economy), where he evaluated economic reviews in Scandinavian newspapers. Due to his task, he was permitted to learn the Scandinavian languages in addition to the languages he already knew: English, French, Italian, Classical Greek and Latin, Hebrew, Egyptian, Sanskrit, Tibetan and Old Persian. His civil obligations lasted until the next world war.

During that period, he resumed lecturing, but declined a teaching contract for Tibetan philology and went on vacation. He brought his vacation to an abrupt end when he was appointed to the position of "extraordinary professor", but ended his academic career in November 1921.

From 1920 onwards, he worked as a lecturer of anthroposophy. In March 1922, he joined the Gründerkreis (circle of priests) of The Christian Community and worked until his death as a priest, seminary teacher, lecturer, independent researcher and writer. In 1928, Beckh's Der kosmische Rhythmus im Markusevangelium ("Mark's Gospel: The Cosmic Rhythm") was published, in which he related the narration of the gospel of Mark to the path of the sun through the twelve zodiacal signs, and mentioned earlier work of Arthur Drews, Eduard Stucken (author of Astralmythen der Hebraeer, Babylonier, und Aegypter, Leipzig, 1896-1907) and Andrzej Niemojewski. In the Introduction to the sequel, Der kosmische Rhythmus, das Sternengeheimnis und Erdengeheimnis im Johannesevangelium ("The Cosmic Rhythm, the Secrets of the Stars and Earth in the Gospel of John") (1930), Beck mentioned favourably Wilhelm Kaiser's Die geometrischen Vorstellungen in der Astronomie (1928), and referred to The Novices of Sais, of Novalis. The cosmic rhythm in Beckh's exposition, he explained, was for Mark's gospel understood more in connection with the "earthly" zodiac of the signs, and for John's gospel more in connection with the "stellar" zodiac of the constellations, while, at the time of the beginning of the Christian era, these were coincident.

Beckh died in Stuttgart, in 1937.

== Bibliography ==
- Die tibetische Übersetzung von Kãlidãsas Meghaduta (The Tibetan Translation of Kalidasa's Mehaduta), Königliche Akademie der Wissenschaften, Berlin 1907
- Udanavarga. Eine Sammlung buddhistischer Sprüche in tibetischer Sprache (Udanavarga: A Collection of Buddhist Sayings in the Tibetan Language), 1911
- Verzeichnis der tibetischen Handschriften der Königlichen Bibliothek zu Berlin (Index of Tibetan Manuscripts in the Royal Library of Berlin), 1914
- Buddhismus. Buddha und seine Lehre (Buddhism: Buddha and his teaching), 2 volumes, Sammlung Göschen 174 and 770, Berlin/Leipzig 1916
  - New edition: Buddha und seine Lehre (Buddha and his teaching), Urachhaus, Stuttgart 1958, ISBN 978-3-8251-7222-0
- Indologie und Geisteswissenschaft (Indology in the light of Humanities): three lectures held at the Goetheanum at Dornach on 1, 8 and 15 October 1920, printed in Kultur und Erziehung (Culture and Education), Der Kommende Tag, Stuttgart 1921
- Es werde Licht. Schöpfungsurworte der Bibel (Let there be light: Fundamental words of Creation in the Bible), Der Kommende Tag, Stuttgart 1921
- Der physische und der geistige Ursprung der Sprache (The Physical and Spiritual Source of Language), Der Kommende Tag, Stuttgart 1921
- Etymologie und Lautbedeutung im Lichte der Geisteswissenschaft (Etymology and the Meaning of Sounds in the context of humanities), Der Kommende Tag, Stuttgart 1921
- Anthroposophie und Universitätswissenschaft (Anthroposophy and University Science), Breslau 1922
- Das geistige Wesen der Tonarten. Versuch einer neuen Betrachtung musikalischer Probleme im Lichte der Geisteswissenschaft (The Spiritual Character of Musical Keys: an attempt at a new view of musical problems in the context of the humanities), Preuß&Jünger, Breslau 1923
- Der Ursprung im Lichte. Bilder der Genesis (The Origin from Light: Pictures of Genesis), Michael Verlag (Christus aller Erde 7), Munich 1924
- Von Buddha zu Christus (From Buddha to Christ), Verlag der Christengemeinschaft (Christus aller Erde 10), Stuttgart 1925
- Der Hingang des Vollendeten. Die Erzählung von Buddhas Erdenabschied und Nirvana (Mahaparinibbanasutta des Palikanon) (The Passing of the Accomplished One: the tale of Buddha's farewell from Earth and his Nirvana (Palikanon's Mahaparinibbanasutta)), Verlag der Christengemeinschaft, Stuttgart 1925; 2nd ed. A. Urachhaus, Stuttgart 1960
- Zarathustra, Verlag der Christengemeinschaft (Christus aller Erde 24), Stuttgart 1927
- Aus der Welt der Mysterien (From the World of Mysteries), Basel 1927
- Der kosmische Rhythmus im Markusevangelium Geering, Dornach 1928
  - New edition: Urachhaus, Stuttgart 1997, ISBN 978-3-8251-7146-9
  - First English edition: Mark's Gospel: The Cosmic Rhythm, Anastasi Ltd 2015 ISBN 0956926681
- Der kosmische Rhythmus, das Sternengeheimnis und Erdengeheimnis im Johannesevangelium. (The Cosmic Rhythm, the Secrets of the Stars and Earth in the Gospel of John), Geering, Dornach 1930
  - First English edition: John’s Gospel: The Cosmic Rhythm –Stars and Stones, Anastasi Ltd 2015, ISBN 978-1-910785-06-5
- Das Christus-Erlebnis im Dramatisch-Musikalischen von Richard Wagners "Parsifal". (The Experience of Christ, within the drama and music of Richard Wagner's "Parsifal"), Verlag der Christengemeinschaft, Stuttgart 1930
- Alchymie. Vom Geheimnis der Stoffeswelt. (Alchemy: the secrets of the world of substances), Geering, Dornach 1931
  - New Edition: Vom Geheimnis der Stoffeswelt, VDM, Saarbrücken 2007, ISBN 978-3-8364-1460-9
- Richard Wagner und das Christentum (Richard Wagner and Christendom), Verlag der Christengemeinschaft, Stuttgart 1933
- Der Hymnus an die Erde. Aus dem altindischen Atharvaveda übersetzt und erläutert (The Hymn to Earth, translated from the ancient Indian Atharvaveda, with comments), Verlag der Christengemeinschaft (Christus aller Erde 34), Stuttgart 1934
- Die Sprache der Tonart in der Musik von Bach bis Bruckner, mit besonderer Berücksichtigung des Wagnerschen Musikdramas (The Language of the Art of Keys in Music from Bach to Bruckner, with special consideration of Wagnerian musical drama), Urachhaus, Stuttgart 1937
- Neue Wege zur Ursprache. Sprachwissenschaftliche Studien. (New Paths to the Proto-language: Linguistic Studies), Urachhaus, Stuttgart 1954

== Sources ==
- Emil Bock: Hermann Beckh, in: Zeitgenossen – Weggenossen – Wegbereiter, Urachhaus, Stuttgart 1959, S. 122–133
- Rudolf F. Gädeke: Hermann Beckh, in: Die Gründer der Christengemeinschaft, Verlag am Goetheanum (Pioniere der Anthroposophie 10), Dornach 1992, S. 164–171
- Gundhild Kačer-Bock: Hermann Beckh. Leben und Werk, Urachhaus, Stuttgart 1997, ISBN 3-8251-7126-4
