= Friedrich Albert Eckstein =

Austrian polymath, friend of Sigmund Freud (1861–1939)

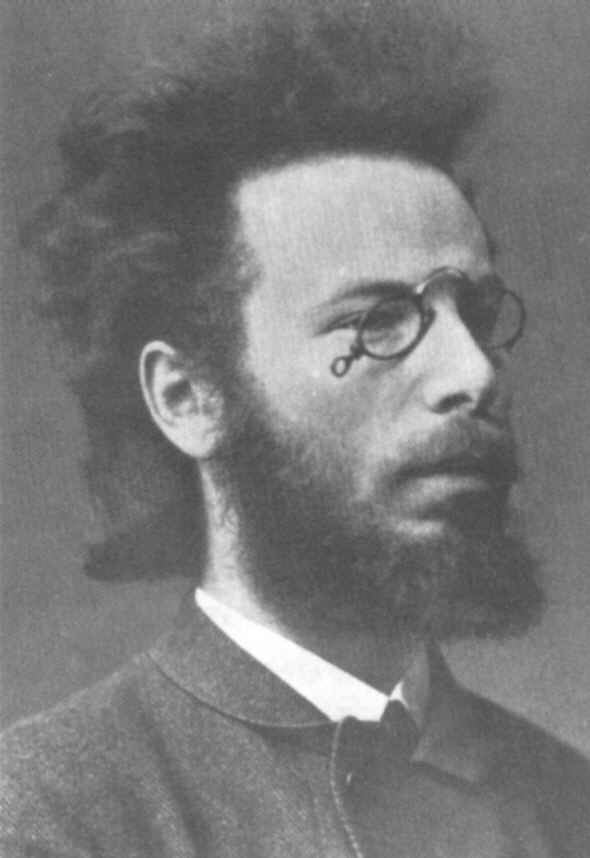
Friedrich Eckstein

Friedrich Albert Eckstein (February 17, 1861, Perchtoldsdorf, Lower Austria – November 10, 1939, Vienna) was an Austrian polymath, theosophist and a friend and temporary co-worker of Sigmund Freud. He was the brother of Emma Eckstein.

Emil Bock states: 'He was the benefactor of Bruckner and Hugo Wolf, indeed the right arm of Bruckner, taking care that his affairs went smoothly. He was a world traveller, had mastered jui-jitsu and taught himself all sorts of difficult tricks. The story went around that he had trained himself to jump off a fast moving train without getting hurt. He, too, was a highly gifted mathematician and a learned man in many respects.'

Also the husband of fellow theosophist and writer Bertha Diener, Eckstein's penchant for occultism first became evident as a member of a vegetarian group which discussed the doctrines of Pythagoras and the Neo-Platonists in Vienna at the end of the 1870s. His esoteric interests later extended to German and Spanish mysticism, the legends surrounding the Templars and the Freemasons, Wagnerian mythology and Eastern religions. In 1889, in the week after the tragedy at Mayerling, in which Crown Prince Rudolf of Austria and his mistress Mary Vetsera were found dead in mysterious circumstances, he and his friend, the composer and organist Anton Bruckner (for whom he also served as private secretary), traveled to the monastery Stift Heiligenkreuz to ask the abbot there for details of what happened.

Eckstein was introduced to Theosophy by Franz Hartmann. In June 1886, he received a deed of foundation for the Vienna Lodge of the Theosophical Society personally signed by Helena Petrovna Blavatsky. In 1887, he thus founded the first official lodge of this society in Austria, of which he became president. He was friends with Gustav Meyrink, associated with the Theosophist Henry Steel Olcott and, until he left Vienna, with Rudolf Steiner. The latter held him in high esteem personally and had spent time with Marie Lang in the circle of Theosophists around 1890, but then came to reject Theosophy as "weak-mindedness".

Eckstein's book on Anton Bruckner was published in 1923.
