= Beckh =

Beckh is a surname. Notable people with the surname include:

- Alois von Beck Widmanstätten, Austrian printer and mineralogist
- Friedrich Beckh (1908–1942), German World War II military aviator
- Hermann Beckh, German Tibetologist and prominent promoter of anthroposophy

== See also ==
- Beck (surname)
