= C. G. Jung House Museum =

- Museum Haus C. G. Jung
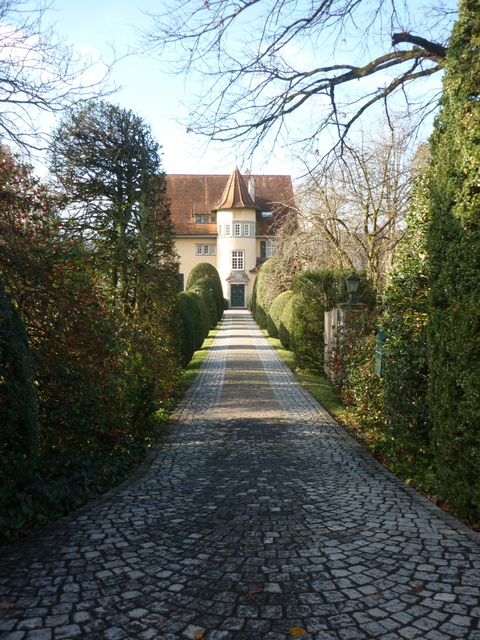
- Access path to the house museum
- Established: April 2018
- Location: Seestrasse 228, Küsnacht, Canton Zürich, Switzerland
- Coordinates: 47.3107°N 8.5833°E
- Type: Historic house museum
- Founder: Foundation C. G. Jung Küsnacht
- Curator: Eva Middendorp-Meier
- Architects: Ernst Robert Fiechter; Walter and Oskar Mertens
- Owner: Heirs of Carl Gustav Jung
- Website: www.cgjunghaus.ch/en

The C. G. Jung House Museum (German Museum Haus C. G. Jung) is a historic house museum. It was the residence of the Swiss psychiatrist, psychologist, and essayist Carl Jung as well as his wife, psychologist Emma Jung-Rauschenbach. It is located at Seestrasse 228, Küsnacht, Switzerland, next to Lake Zürich.

Built in 1908, the house was restored a century later thanks to the Foundation C. G. Jung Küsnacht. In 2017 it was transformed into a museum, and opened to the public in May 2018.

== History ==
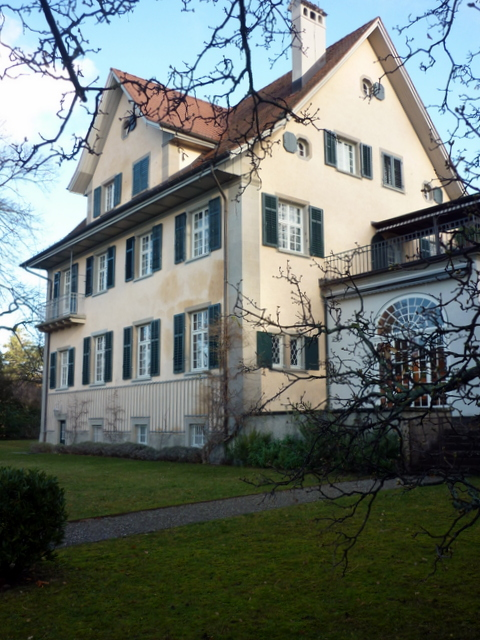
Facade overlooking the lake

The project began in 1906, with a letter from Jung to his cousin Ernst Robert Fiechter (1875–1948), architect and professor of architecture history at the Technical University of Munich: "We have in mind to build a house someday, in the country near Zürich, on the lake".

At that time, Jung was an assistant medical director at the Burghölzli psychiatric clinic in Zürich, with limited financial resources. Jung could only afford to build a stately home after his wife inherited her father's wealth.

In 1907, Jung found the property that suited his preferences next to Lake Zürich in Küsnacht. In 1908, he bought the land, and commissioned the construction of a large three-story house to his cousin Ernst Robert Fiechter and to garden architects Walter and Oskar Mertens. Jung played a decisive role in the planning and design of the house and garden.

In 1909, Jung resigned from his position in Burghölzli and moved to his new house in Küsnacht; he lived there with his family for the rest of his life. His income now came from his private practice. The early years in the house, from 1909 to 1910, were the most intense time of his relationship with Sabina Spielrein.

In 1960, Jung was appointed an honorary citizen of Küsnacht on the day of his 85th anniversary. He died at his home on June 6, 1961, after a brief illness.

== House museum ==
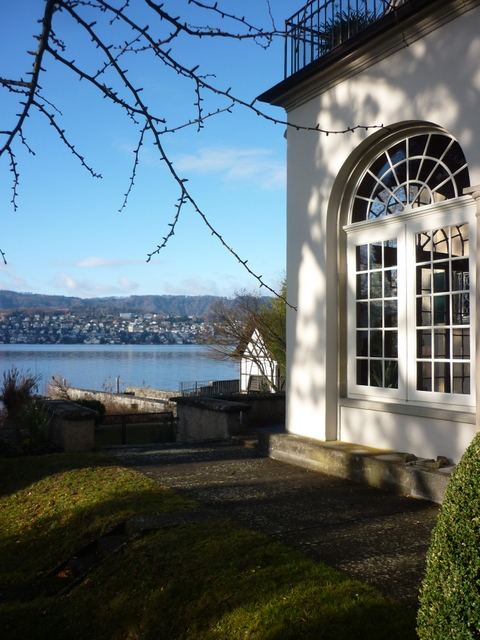
Lake view

The Foundation C. G. Jung Küsnacht restored the home in 2017 and transformed it into a house museum. The restoration of the gardens and interior spaces is largely faithful to the original design. The museum, which opened its doors in April 2018, defines itself as a scholar's house and museum house; it can be visited with guided tours. The central motto for visitors is: "Guest at C. G. and Emma Jung-Rauschenbach's house".

The lounge, dining room and veranda, host a permanent exhibition dedicated to Jung's family life and activities in his spare time. The study/consultation room, the waiting room and the library offer a vision of Jung's work style and research interests. Another room is reserved for temporary exhibitions, hosting extended samples that illustrate the general themes of the museum.

== See also ==
- Bollingen Tower
- Psychology Club Zürich
- C. G. Jung Institute, Zürich
- Sigmund Freud Museum (Vienna)
- Freud Museum
- List of museums in Switzerland

== Bibliography ==
- Ruth Ammann (1995). Landscapes, houses and rooms where Carl Gustav Jung lived, worked and was at home: 40 selected slides from the original show of 117 pictures. Küsnacht: Ruth Ammann / Erbengemeinschaft C. G. Jung.
- Barbara Hannah, Eva Wertenschlag-Birkhäuser (2006). C. G. Jung, sein Leben und Werk; biographische Aufzeichnungen (2ª ed.). Küsnacht: Verl. Stiftung für Jung'sche Psychologie. p. 479. ISBN 3-908116-62-7.
- Aniela Jaffé (1982). Aus C. G. Jungs letzten Jahren, und andere Aufsätze (2ª ed.). Einsiedeln: Daimon-Verlag. ISBN 3-85630-009-0.
- Andreas Jung (2014). "Das grosse Haus am See". Küsnachter Jahrheft (PDF). Vol. 54. pp. 59–69.
- Andreas Jung; Regula Michel; Arthur Rüegg, eds. (2009). Haus C. G. Jung: Entstehung und Erneuerung des Wohnhauses von Emma und Carl Gustav Jung-Rauschenbach. SzZuIDS NEBIS ZBZ (Osiris-Link), Küsnacht: Stiftung C. G. Jung Küsnacht. p. 147. ISBN 978-3-905681-40-6.
  - Andreas Jung; Regula Michel; Arthur Rüegg; Judith Rohrer; Daniel Ganz (2009). The House of C. G. Jung: The History and Restoration of the Residence of Emma and Carl Gustav Jung-Rauschenbach. Stiftung C. G. Jung Kusnacht. ISBN 9783905681413.
- s.n. (1911). "Landhaus Dr. C. G. Jung in Küsnacht: erbaut durch Architekt Dr.-Ing. E. Fiechter in München". Schweizerische Bauzeitung. Vol. 56/57. pp. 343–344.
