= Volker Bräutigam =

German composer (1939–2022)

- Born: 23 May 1939; Frohnau
- Died: 31 May 2022 (aged 83)
- Occupations: Composer; Church musician; Academic teacher

Volker Bräutigam (23 May 1939 – 31 May 2022) was a German composer, and church musician.

== Life and career ==
Bräutigam was born in the village of Frohnau in southeast Germany. From 1949 and 1953 he sang with the Dresdner Kreuzchor, at that time under the direction of Rudolf Mauersberger. In 1957 he entered the Musikhochschule Leipzig and remained there until 1962 studying composition under Johannes Weyrauch as well as conducting, piano, organ, and film music. After completing his studies he worked for the next two years as an assistant organist and a free-lance composer for the animation department of the East German film studio DEFA.

In 1962 he succeeded Johannes Weyrauch as cantor at the Heilandskirche in Leipzig, a post he would hold for over 30 years. In the 1980s and early 90s he also taught organ and composition at the Evangelische Hochschule für Kirchenmusik Halle. He was appointed professor of the University of Music and Theatre Leipzig in 1993.

Bräutigam's compositions, which are primarily choral and organ music, are stylistically diverse. The critic for Westdeutsche Zeitung described his Epitaph for Maximilian Kolbe as "a work of surprising sounds, melodic lines, and chords, a piece that translates the ideas of contemporary music". Bernard Holland of The New York Times noted that his choral piece Drei Seligpreisungen (Three Beatitudes) was characterised by "long melodic lines with wide intervals, sometimes using them in opposing keys". His chorale prelude, Christ ist erstanden, has jazz influences.

== Selected works ==
- Epitaph for Maximilian Kolbe (1975).
- Aus der Tiefe rufe ich, Herr, zu dir (1970/1995)
- Drei Jazzverwandte Choralvorspiele
