= Bollingen Tower =

House built by psychiatrist Carl Jung

Coordinates: 47.2211°N 8.9051°E

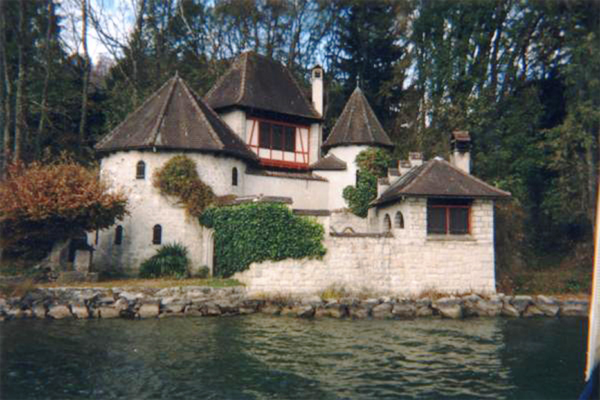
Bollingen Tower as seen from Lake Zürich

The Bollingen Tower is a structure built by Swiss psychiatrist Carl Jung. In appearance, it is a small castle with four towers. It is located in the village of Bollingen on the shore of the Obersee (upper lake) basin of Lake Zürich.

== History ==
Jung bought the land in 1922 after the death of his mother. In 1923, he built a two-storey round tower on this land. It was a stone structure suitable to be lived in. Additions to this tower were constructed in 1927, 1931, and 1935, resulting in a building that has four connected parts.

A second storey was added to the 1927 addition after the death of Jung's wife in 1955, signifying "an extension of consciousness achieved in old age."

For much of his life Jung spent several months each year living at Bollingen. The Tower is now owned by a family trust and is not open to the public.

The Bollingen Foundation, created in 1945 but inactive since 1968, was named after it.

== Inscribed cube ==
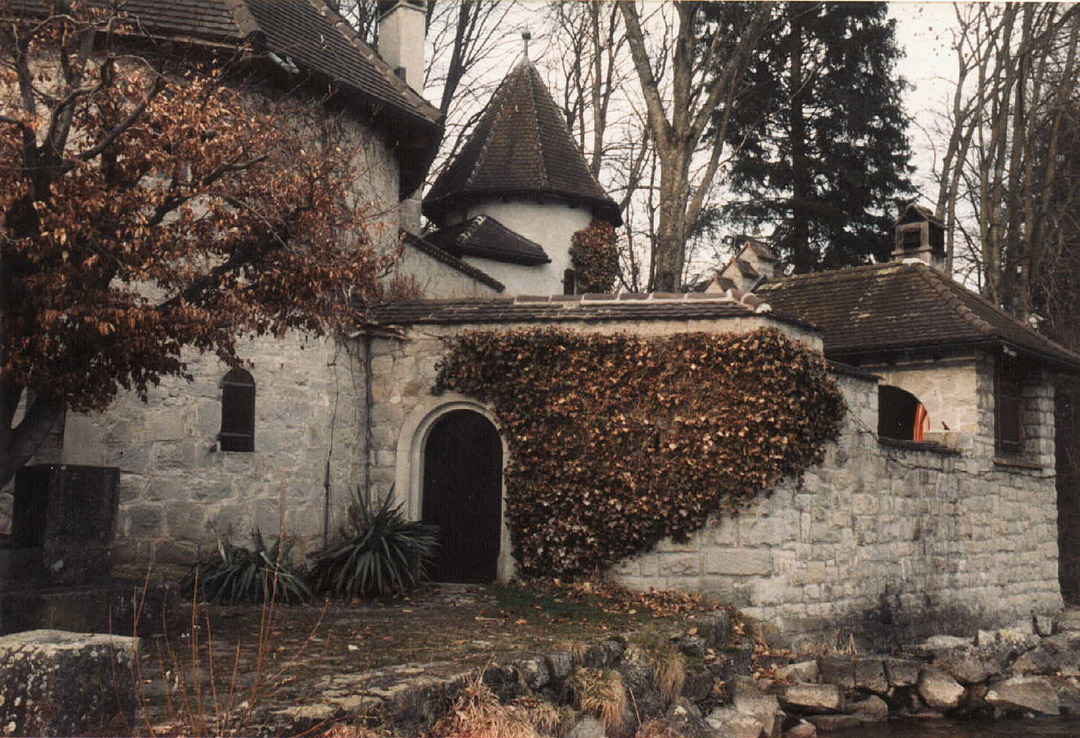
The entrance to the Tower

In 1950, on the occasion of his 75th birthday, Jung set up a stone cube on the lakeshore, just west of the tower, inscribing it on three sides. One side contains a quote taken from the Rosarium philosophorum:

Hic lapis exilis extat, pretio quoque vilis, spernitur a stultis, amatur plus ab edoctis.

Here stands the mean, uncomely stone,
'Tis very cheap in price!
The more it is despised by fools,
The more loved by the wise.

A dedication is also inscribed on this side of the stone: IN MEMORIAM NAT[ivitatis] S[uae] DIEI LXXV C G JUNG EX GRAT[itudine] FEC[it] ET POS[uit] A[nn]O MCML (In memory of his 75th birthday, C.G. Jung out of gratitude made and set it up in the year 1950.)

The second side of the cube depicts a Telesphorus figure, a homunculus bearing a lantern and wearing a hooded cape. It is surrounded by a Greek inscription:

«Ὁ Αἰὼν παῖς ἐστι παίζων, πεττεύων· παιδὸς ἡ βασιληίη» · Τελεσφόρος διελαύνων τοὺς σκοτεινοὺς τοῦ κόσμου τόπους, καὶ ὡς ἀστὴρ ἀναλάμπων ἐκ τοῦ βάθους, ὁδηγεῖ «παρ' Ἠελίοιο πύλας καὶ δῆμον ὀνείρων».

The inscription says:

Time is a child — playing like a child — playing a board game — the kingdom of the child. This is Telesphoros, who roams through the dark regions of this cosmos and glows like a star out of the depths. He points the way to the gates of the sun and to the land of dreams.

"Time is a child at play, gambling; a child's is the kingship" is a fragment attributed to Heraclitus.

"He points the way to the gates of the sun and to the land of dreams" is a quote from the Odyssey (Book 24, Verse 12). It refers to Hermes the psychopomp, who leads away the spirits of the slain suitors.

The second side also contains a four-part mandala of alchemical significance. The top quarter of the mandala is dedicated to Saturn, the bottom quarter to Mars, the left quarter to Sol-Jupiter [male], and the right quarter to Luna-Venus [female].

The third side of the cube is the side that faces the lake. It bears a Latin inscription of sayings which, Jung says, "are more or less quotations from alchemy."

The inscription reads:

I am an orphan, alone; nevertheless I am found everywhere. I am one, but opposed to myself. I am youth and old man at one and the same time. I have known neither father nor mother, because I have had to be fetched out of the deep like a fish, or fell like a white stone from heaven. In woods and mountains I roam, but I am hidden in the innermost soul of man. I am mortal for everyone, yet I am not touched by the cycle of aeons.

== Gallery ==
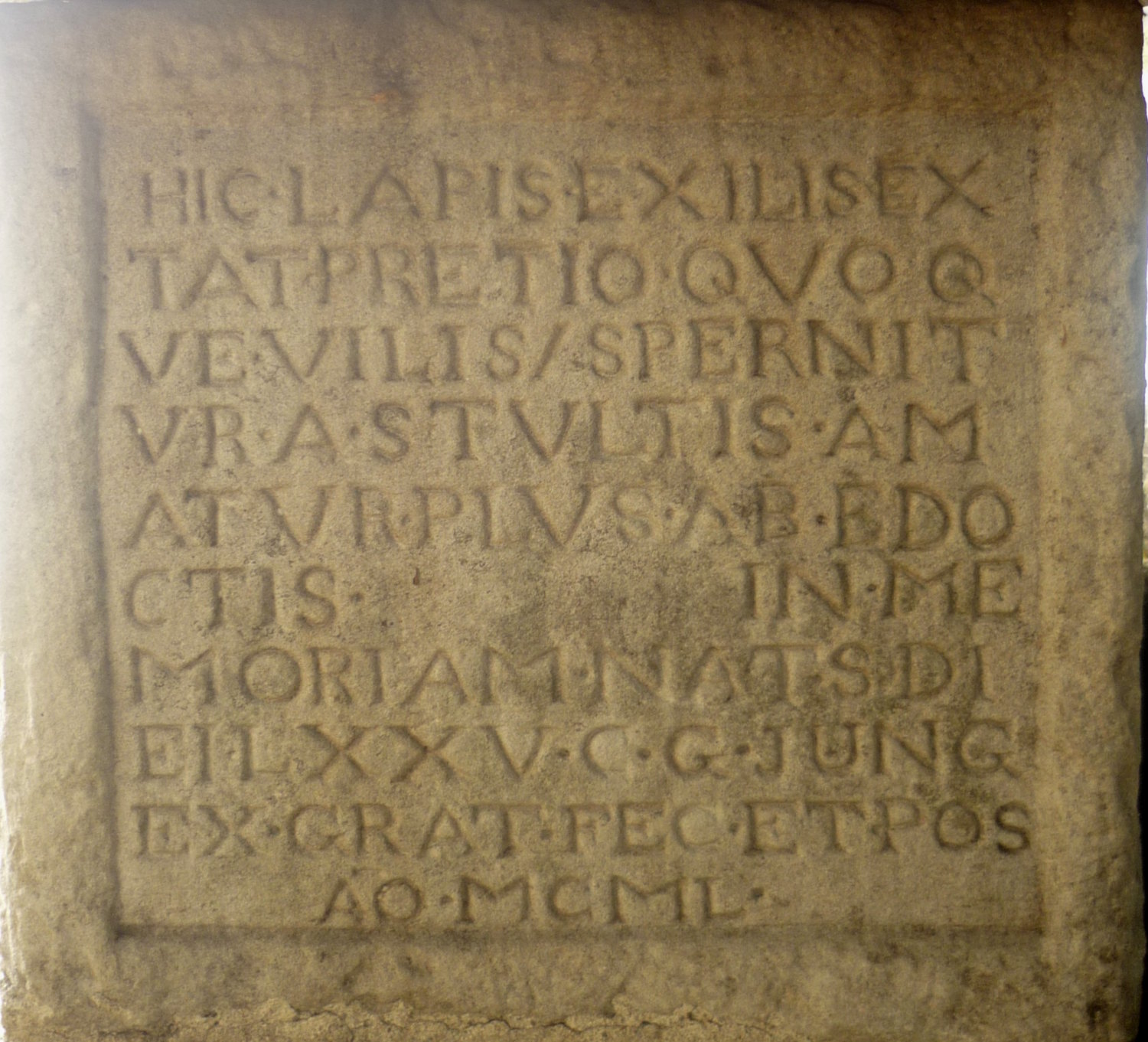
The Rosarium quote and Jung's dedication

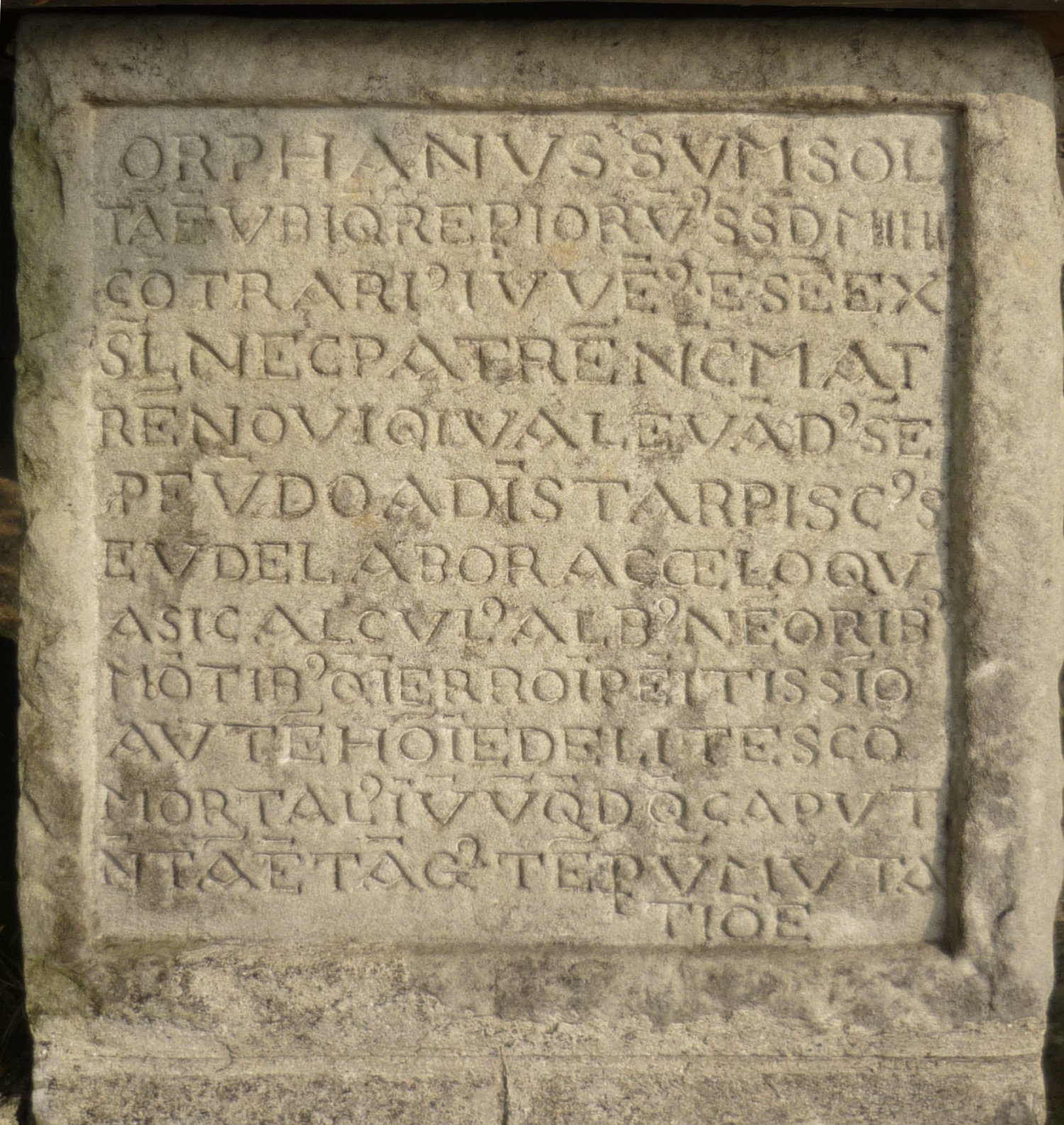
Latin alchemical inscription

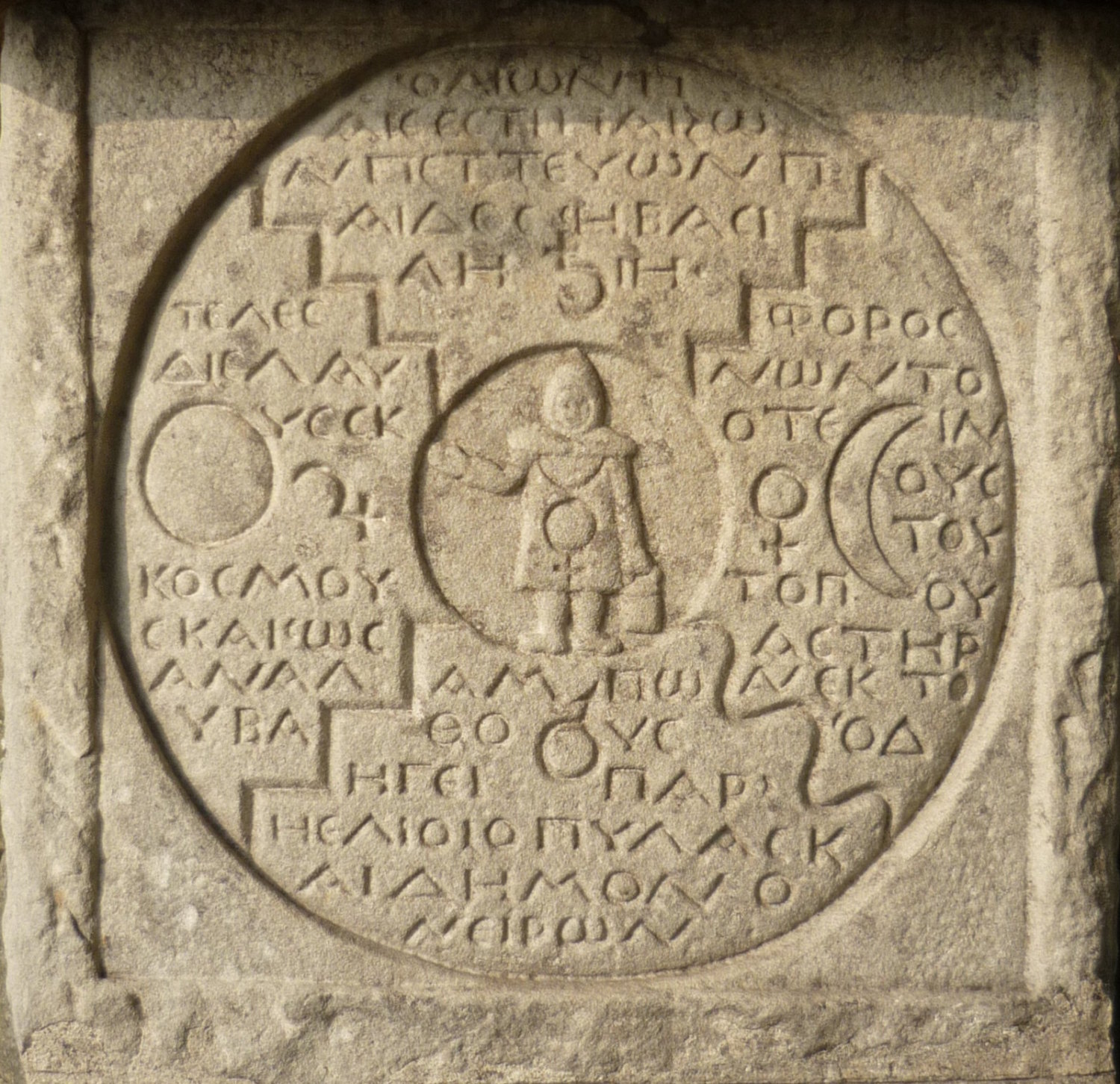
Greek inscription within a four-part mandala

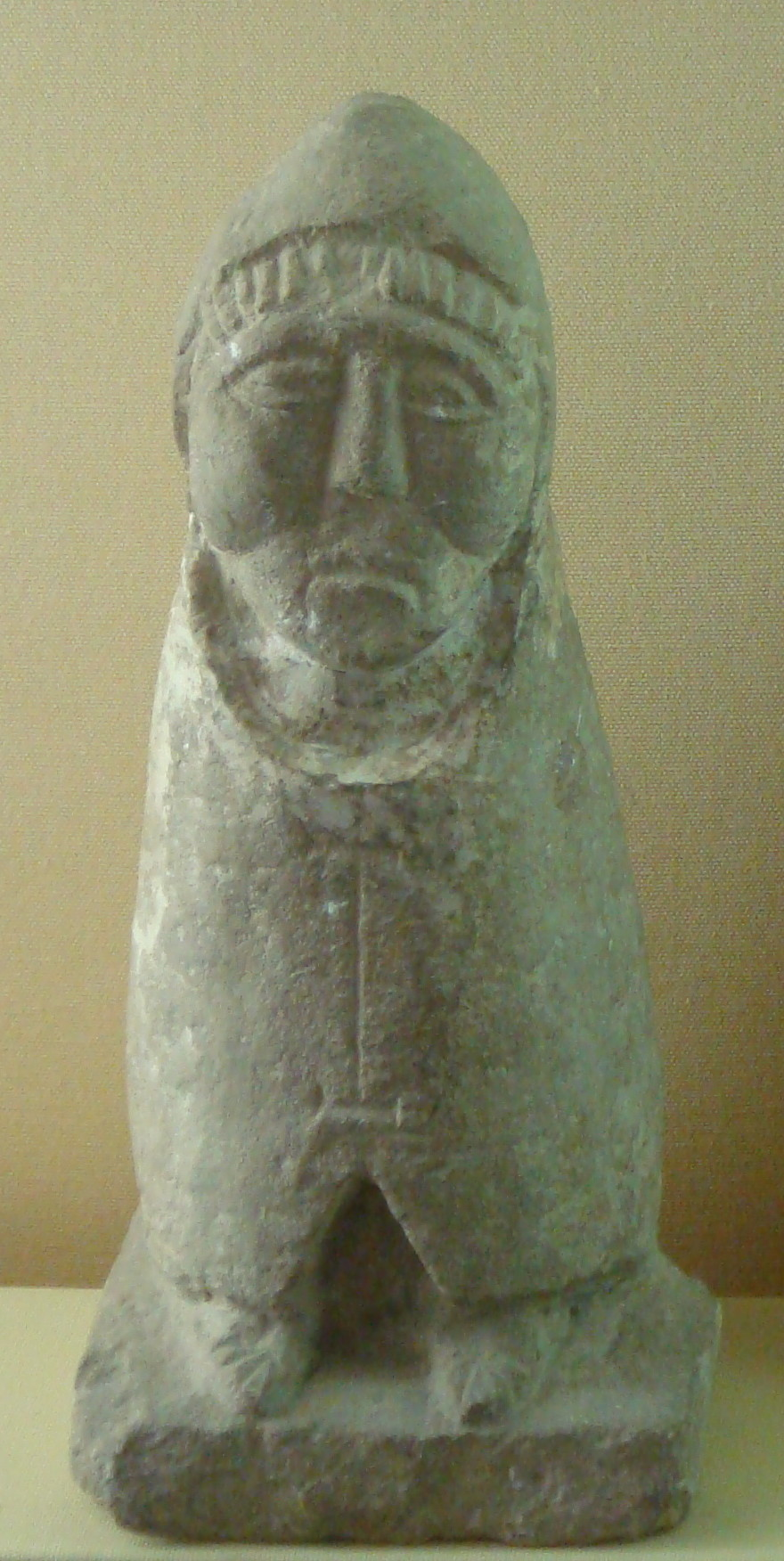
An ancient statue of the god Telesphorus

== See also ==
- Bollingen Foundation
- Bollingen Prize
- C.G. Jung House Museum

== Bibliography ==
- Dunne, Claire. Carl Jung: Wounded Healer of the Soul: An Illustrated Biography. Continuum International Publishing Group (2002), ISBN 978-0-8264-6307-4, pp. 70f., 106–108, 139, 192. Google books
- Hart, Vaughan. 'Carl Jung's Alchemical Tower at Bollingen', Res: Anthropology and Aesthetics, 25, 1994, 36–50
- Jung, Carl Gustav (1989). Aniela Jaffé (ed.). Memories, Dreams, Reflections. New York: Vintage Books. ISBN 978-0-679-72395-0.
