= Fellows in American Letters of the Library of Congress =

The Fellows in American Letters of the Library of Congress are awarded by the Library of Congress.

== History ==
In 1943, during his tenure as Librarian of Congress (1939–1944), poet Archibald MacLeish appointed poet Allen Tate as Consultant in Poetry to the Library of Congress (1941–1986, the predecessor of the current Poet Laureate Consultant in Poetry to the Library of Congress). Tate, in turn, created an advisory panel of "Fellows in American Letters," which, over the course of the next few years, would include most of the pillars of English modernist literature. Among them were T. S. Eliot, W. H. Auden, Mark Van Doren, Van Wyck Brooks, Carl Sandburg, Willard Thorp, Ted Spencer, Conrad Aiken, and Karl Shapiro. Virtually all of the Fellows were friends of Tate, several of them his protégés.

In 1944, MacLeish stepped down as Librarian and Tate's term expired. MacLeish's successor, non-poet Luther H. Evans (1945–1953), relied on Tate to serve as an ongoing consultant and recommend candidates to fill the Poetry Consultant position. Among those Tate recommended to become Consultant were his old friend and colleague Robert Penn Warren (1944–1945), Louise Bogan (1945–1946), Shapiro (1946–1947), Robert Lowell (1947–1948), Léonie Adams (1948–1949), Elizabeth Bishop (1949–1950), and Aiken (1950–1952). Most Consultants accepted invitations to become Fellows when their terms expired.

The Fellows may be best known for the controversy created in 1948–1949 over the newly established Bollingen Prize which was to be awarded by the Library of Congress upon the recommendation of a jury consisting of a committee of the Fellows. Eliot and other renowned poets who felt a great debt to Ezra Pound planned to use the prize to build a momentum to free Pound, then confined in St. Elizabeths Hospital in Washington, where he had been confined after being charged with treason but declared mentally unfit to stand trial.

Pound was awarded the prize for The Pisan Cantos in 1949, despite objections by juror Shapiro (who had originally favored the award but then withdrew his vote) over the anti-Semitic nature of many parts the work Pound began while incarcerated in an American military prison in Pisa. A firestorm followed, dividing the literary establishment. And the public outcry over the involvement of a public institution (the Library of Congress) in bestowing an award on a fascist sympathizer led Congress to end the Library's participation in the prize, which was subsequently awarded by the Yale University Library. The following year (1950), Yale awarded the prize to the thoroughly non-controversial Wallace Stevens.
