= Maria Darmstädter =

German religious scholar and Holocaust victim (1892–1943)

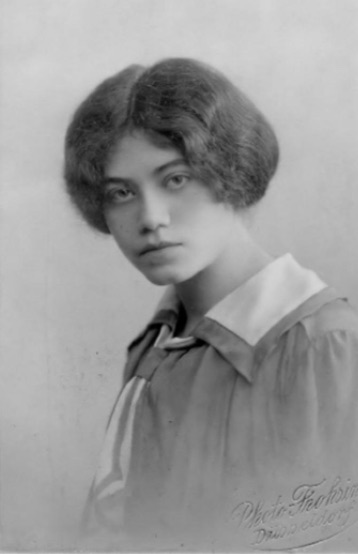
Maria Darmstädter

Maria Darmstädter (22 June 1892 – 13 February 1943), also known under her married name Maria Krehbiel-Darmstädter, was a German religious scholar and Holocaust victim. Born to a prominent Jewish family from Mannheim, she was baptised in the Lutheran church as an adult and shortly after joined the newly established Christian Community in the early 1920s. She was one of the community's first and most influential members, and contributed greatly to its development and liturgy. She was deported to Gurs internment camp by the Nazis in October 1940 and murdered in Auschwitz. Her letters from Nazi concentration camps were published in 1970.

== Bibliography ==
- Briefe aus Gurs und Limonest, 1940–1943 (published 1970)
