= Ernst Robert Fiechter =

Ernst Robert Fiechter (28 October 1875, in Basel – 19 April 1948, in St. Gallen) was a Swiss architect and archaeologist. He is remembered for his research of ancient Greek temple and theatre architecture. He was a cousin to psychologist Carl Gustav Jung.

He studied architecture and archaeology at the Ludwig-Maximilians-Universität München, obtaining his doctorate in 1904 with a dissertation on the Temple of Aphaea in Aegina. In 1906, he received his habilitation, and in 1911 was named a professor of architectural history at Technische Hochschule Stuttgart.

From 1900 onward, he was engaged in educational travels to Egypt, Greece and Italy. As a professor at Stuttgart, he was involved in the restoration of many architectural structures of the local region. In connection with the 1919 opening of the Waldorf school and associated activity of theologian Friedrich Rittelmeyer, (the founder of Die Christengemeinschaft in 1922), Fiechter subsequently made the acquaintance of Rudolf Steiner, the founder of anthroposophy. Being inspired by Steiner's ideas, Fiechter became a lifelong devotee of anthroposophy.

== Selected works ==
- Der Tempel der Aphaia auf Aegina, 1904.
- Die baugeschichtliche Entwicklung des antiken Theaters : Eine Studie, 1914.
- Zwiefalten, 1927.
- Das Theater in Oropos, 1930.
- Antike griechische Theaterbauten, 1930.
- Das Theater in Megalopolis, 1931.
- Die Theater von Oiniadai und Neupleuron, 1931.
- Das Theater in Eretria, 1937.
