= Bollingen Prize =

American biennial poetry prize

The Bollingen Prize for Poetry is a literary honor bestowed on an American poet. Every two years, the award recognizes a poet for lifetime achievement; until 2025 it could also honor a best new volume of work. It is awarded without nominations or submissions by the Beinecke Rare Book and Manuscript Library of Yale University.

== Inception and controversy ==
The prize was established in 1948 by Paul Mellon, funded by a US $10,000 grant from the Bollingen Foundation to the Library of Congress. Both the prize and the foundation are named after the village of Bollingen, Switzerland and the Bollingen Tower, where Swiss psychiatrist Carl Jung had his home. The inaugural prize, chosen by a jury of Fellows in American Letters of the Library of Congress, was first awarded to Ezra Pound for his collection of poems The Pisan Cantos.

The choice of a work by Ezra Pound who had been a committed fascist sympathizer and who was then under indictment for treason in World War II for his antisemitic broadcasts infuriated many. A bitter controversy ensued in the press, and a congressional committee requested the Library of Congress disassociate itself from the award. The unused portion of the grant was returned to the Bollingen Foundation in 1949.

== Continuance through the Yale University Library ==
The Bollingen Foundation decided to continue the program with the administrative tasks being handled by the Yale University Library. The prize was awarded annually from 1948 to 1963. In 1963, the amount of the award was increased to $5,000. After 1963, it was given every other year. The Bollingen Foundation was dissolved in 1968, and the Andrew W. Mellon Foundation took over funding. In 1973, the Mellon Foundation established an endowment of $100,000 to enable the Yale Library to continue awarding the prize in perpetuity.

In 1961, a similar prize was set up by the Bollingen Foundation for best translation. The prize for best translation was given out only from 1961–1968. It was first won by Robert Fitzgerald for his translation of the Odyssey. It has also been won by Walter W. Arndt for his translation of Eugene Onegin, and in 1963 by Richard Wilbur and Mona Van Duyn jointly.

In 2025, the library removed recent publication from the award criteria, making the Bollingen officially a lifetime achievement honor, and added a companion book prize, the Patricia Cannon Willis Prize for American Poetry, for a book published during the award period. The Bollingen now carries $175,000 and the Willis Prize $25,000. Arthur Sze received the 2025 Bollingen Prize and Major Jackson the first Willis Prize.

== Recipients ==
- 1948 – Ezra Pound
- 1949 – Wallace Stevens
- 1950 – John Crowe Ransom
- 1951 – Marianne Moore
- 1952 – William Carlos Williams
- 1953 – W. H. Auden
- 1954 – Louise Bogan and Leonie Adams
- 1955 – Conrad Aiken
- 1956 – Allen Tate
- 1957 – E. E. Cummings
- 1958 – Theodore Roethke
- 1959 – Delmore Schwartz
- 1960 – Yvor Winters
- 1961 – John Hall Wheelock and Richard Eberhart
- 1962 – Robert Frost

frequency changed—one award every two years going forward

- 1965 – Horace Gregory
- 1967 – Robert Penn Warren
- 1969 – John Berryman and Karl Shapiro
- 1971 – Richard Wilbur and Mona Van Duyn
- 1973 – James Merrill
- 1975 – A. R. Ammons
- 1977 – David Ignatow
- 1979 – W. S. Merwin
- 1981 – Howard Nemerov and May Swenson
- 1983 – Anthony Hecht and John Hollander
- 1985 – John Ashbery and Fred Chappell
- 1987 – Stanley Kunitz
- 1989 – Edgar Bowers
- 1991 – Laura Riding Jackson and Donald Justice
- 1993 – Mark Strand
- 1995 – Kenneth Koch
- 1997 – Gary Snyder
- 1999 – Robert Creeley
- 2001 – Louise Glück
- 2003 – Adrienne Rich
- 2005 – Jay Wright
- 2007 – Frank Bidart
- 2009 – Allen Grossman
- 2011 – Susan Howe
- 2013 – Charles Wright
- 2015 – Nathaniel Mackey
- 2017 – Jean Valentine
- 2019 – Charles Bernstein
- 2021 – Mei-mei Berssenbrugge
- 2023 – Joy Harjo
- 2025 – Arthur Sze

== See also ==
- American poetry
- Bollingen Foundation
- Bollingen Tower
- Carl Jung

=== Lists ===
- List of American literary awards
- List of literary awards
- List of poetry awards
- List of years in literature
- List of years in poetry
