= Clara Schlaffhorst =

German singer

- Born: 16 October 1863; Memel
- Died: 1945; Seefeld, Pommern
- Occupation: Singer

Clara Schlaffhorst (16 October 1863 – 17 February 1945) was a German singer and promoter of physical education including breathing gymnastics. Schlaffhorst and Hedwig Andersen founded the Methode nach Schlaffhorst und Andersen, a method of respiration, speech and voice therapy.

Schlaffhorst was born in Memel. She advocated a system of breathing gymnastics with physical education with Hedwig Andersen. Their method involved breathing, rhythmic movement and swinging exercises to train posture-breath coordination. In 1916, they founded an institute to promote this method known as Tonschwingubungen (sound-swinging exercises) until the 1940s. Schlaffhorst was influenced by the Swiss organist Leo Kofler. In 1897, she translated his book The Art of Breathing into German. The book formed the basis of her Rotenburger Breathing School (Rotenburg School of Respiration).

The Rotenburg School of Respiration became the Schlaffhorst-Andersen School in 1982.

== Publications ==
- Atmung and Stimme.
- Atmung Stimme Bewegung.
