= Hedwig Andersen =

Hedwig Andersen (9 June 1866 in Memel, Kingdom of Prussia − 29 March 1957 in Schönborn near Eutin) was with Clara Schlaffhorst founder of the Methode nach Schlaffhorst und Andersen, a method of respiration, speech and voice therapy.

== Life ==
As the daughter of a master rope maker she grew up in Memel. She trained as a piano teacher in Sondershausen in Thuringia. Student of the singing teacher Julius Hey, through whom she met Clara Schlaffhorst, who was also a student of his. They translated the book "The Art of Breathing" by Leo Kofler into German. This resulted in the joint research and teaching of breathing, voice and movement. In 1910 she began teaching in Berlin. In 1916 Schlaffhorst and Andersen founded the "School for the Art of Breathing and Singing", the first training school in Rothenburg an der Fulda. This was later moved to Hustedt/Südheide (1926-1942) and Seefeld/Pomerania (1942-1945). After the death of Clara Schlaffhorst and the escape from Pomerania she was taken in by the former student Annemarie Fischer on her estate in Schönborn (Schleswig-Holstein), where she remained until her death at the age of 90.

== Publications ==
- Atmung and Stimme.
- Atmung Stimme Bewegung.
