= Emil Bock =

German anthroposophist, author and theologian

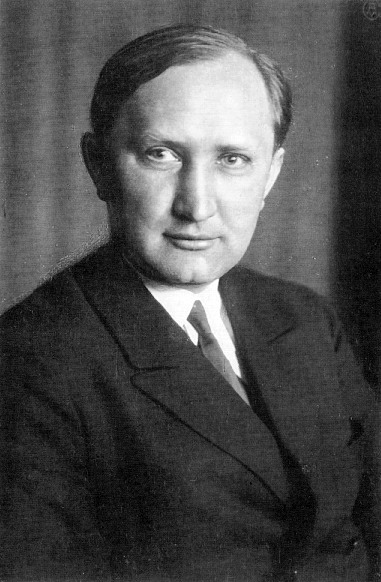
Emil Bock Portrait

Emil Bock (born 19 May 1895 in Barmen; died 6 December 1959 in Stuttgart) was a German anthroposophist, author, theologian, and one of the founders of The Christian Community.

In 1914, he began a study of languages at the University of Bonn. However, the same year he enlisted as a volunteer in the First World War and was sent to the front in Flanders, where he was wounded. In 1916, Bock met the theologian Friedrich Rittelmeyer, and from 1918 he studied Protestant theology in Berlin before graduating in 1921. Bock became one of the founders of the Christian Community in Switzerland that same year. He later became the seminary leader of the Christian Community, and after the death of Friedrich Rittelmeyer, the Community's leader in 1938.

In 1941, the Nazi regime banned the Christian Community due to its alleged "Jewish" and "Masonic" influence, and Bock was sent to the concentration camp Welzheim the same year. He was released from the concentration camp in 1942, but was under surveillance for the rest of the war. After the war, Bock was a principal leader in the rebuilding of the Christian Community.

== Works ==
- Zur religiösen Erneuerung (mit Friedrich Rittelmeyer), Sonderdruck (aus Die Drei, Jg. 1, Heft 9), 1922
- Die Kindheit Jesu. Zwei apokryphe Evangelien, Michael Verlag (Christus aller Erde 14/15), München 1924
- Das lichte Jahr. Vom Jahreslauf und den Festen (mit Rudolf Meyer), Verlag der Christengemeinschaft (Christus aller Erde 4), Stuttgart 1924
- Gegenwartsrätsel im Offenbarungslicht (mit Rudolf Frieling, Johannes Werner Klein, Eberhard Kurras und Rudolf Meyer), Verlag der Christengemeinschaft (Christus aller Erde 16), Stuttgart 1925
- Ein Spiel von Johannes dem Täufer. Gemeinde-Spiel zur Sommersonnenwende, Stuttgart 1927
- Beiträge zum Verständnis des Evangeliums, Typoskripte, Stuttgart 1927–29 (neu bearbeitet in zwei Bänden 1950)
  - Neuausgabe als: Das Evangelium. Gesammelte Betrachtungen zum Neuen Testament, Stuttgart 1984 (2. A. 1995), ISBN 3-87838-406-8
- Boten des Geistes. Schwäbische Geistesgeschichte und christliche Zukunft, Stuttgart 1929 (4. A. 1987)
- Die Katakomben. Bilder von den Mysterien des Urchristentums (mit Robert Goebel), Stuttgart 1930 (2., neu bearbeitete Auflage 1960)
- Wiederholte Erdenleben. Die Wiederverkörperungsidee in der deutschen Geistesgeschichte, Stuttgart 1932 (7. A. 1996), ISBN 3-87838-027-5
- Beiträge zur Übersetzung des Neuen Testaments, Typoskripte, Stuttgart 1930–33 (neu bearbeitet in zwei Bänden 1950)
  - Neuausgabe als: Das Neue Testament, Stuttgart 1980; aktuell: Stuttgart 1998, ISBN 3-8251-7221-X
- Beiträge zur Geistesgeschichte der Menschheit, 7 Bände, Stuttgart 1934ff
  - 1 Urgeschichte, 1934 (9. A. 2005), ISBN 3-87838-224-3
  - 2 Moses und sein Zeitalter, 1935 (8. A. 1996), ISBN 3-87838-225-1
  - 3 Könige und Propheten, 1936 (6. A. 1997), ISBN 3-87838-226-X
  - 4 Cäsaren und Apostel, 1937 (7. A. 1999), ISBN 3-87838-227-8
  - 5 Kindheit und Jugend Jesu, 1939 (9. A. 1994), ISBN 3-87838-228-6
  - 6 Die drei Jahre, 1948 (8. A. 1992), ISBN 3-87838-229-4
  - 7 Paulus, 1954 (5. A. 1997), ISBN 3-87838-230-8
- Katholizismus, Protestantismus, Christengemeinschaft. Alte und neue Geistigkeit. Ein Vortrag, Stuttgart 1940
- Im michaelischen Zeitalter, Stuttgart 1948
  - Neuausgabe als: Michaelisches Zeitalter. Die Menschheit vor dem Zeitgewissen, Stuttgart 1979 (2. A. 1995), ISBN 3-87838-265-0
- Reisetagebücher. Italien – Griechenland – Heiliges Land, Stuttgart 1949 (3. üb. A. 1986), ISBN 3-87838-460-2
- Apokalypse. Betrachtungen über die Offenbarung des Johannes, Stuttgart 1951 (5. A. 1997), ISBN 3-87838-362-2
- Die neue Reformation. Vier Vorträge, Stuttgart 1953
- Romanische Baukunst und Plastik in Württemberg, Stuttgart 1958
  - Neu herausgegeben und erweitert als: Schwäbische Romanik, Stuttgart 1973
- Das Zeitalter der romanischen Kunst mit besonderer Berücksichtigung der württembergischen Denkmäler, Stuttgart 1958
- Zeitgenossen – Weggenossen – Wegbereiter, Stuttgart 1959
- Was will die Christengemeinschaft? Zwei öffentliche Vorträge. Herausgegeben von Gottfried Husemann und Kurt von Wistinghausen, Stuttgart 1961
- Rudolf Steiner. Studien zu seinem Lebensgang und Lebenswerk, Stuttgart 1961 (3. erw. A. 1990), ISBN 3-7725-0475-2
- Der Kreis der Jahresfeste, Stuttgart 1962 (6. A. 1999), ISBN 3-87838-244-8
- Briefe, Stuttgart 1968, ISBN 3-87838-030-5
- Das dreifache Mariengeheimnis. Drei Vorträge, Stuttgart 1997, ISBN 3-8251-7147-7

== Literature ==
- Rudolf F. Gädeke: "Emil Bock", in: Die Gründer der Christengemeinschaft, Verlag am Goetheanum (Pioniere der Anthroposophie 10), Dornach 1992, S. 68–85, ISBN 3-7235-0639-9
- Gundhild Kačer-Bock: Emil Bock. Leben und Werk, Urachhaus, Stuttgart 1993, ISBN 3-87838-970-1
- Lothar Gassmann: Das anthroposophische Bibelverständnis. Eine kritische Untersuchung unter besonderer Berücksichtigung der exegetischen Veröffentlichungen von Rudolf Steiner, Friedrich Rittelmeyer, Emil Bock und Rudolf Frieling, Brockhaus, Wuppertal 1993, ISBN 3-417-29383-9
