= The Christian Community =

Esoteric Christian denomination

- Die Christengemeinschaft
- Classification: Independent Sacramental Movement
- Theology: Esoteric and Liberal
- Polity: Congregational
- Erzoberlenker: Christward Kroener
- Headquarters: Stuttgart, Germany
- Founder: Friedrich Rittelmeyer
- Members: 30,000
- Seminaries: 3
- Logo

The Christian Community is an esoterically-oriented Christian denomination established in Germany in 1922 by Lutheran ministers influenced by Anthroposophy. As of 2023, it claims approximately 35,000 members in approximately 200 congregations.

== History ==
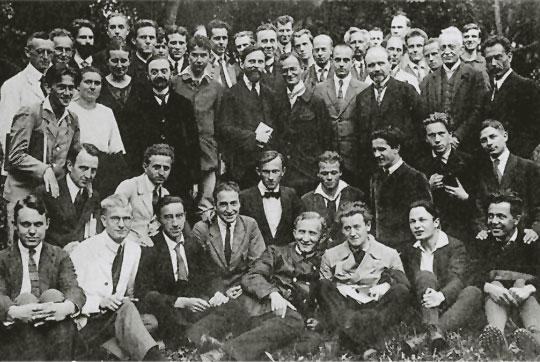
The Christian Community founders, pictured on 16 September 1922

During the early growth of the Anthroposophical Society, some Lutheran pastors in Germany appealed to Rudolf Steiner for a system of worship oriented towards his concept of Jesus Christ as the first fully initiated human in history, possessing absolute consciousness of the spiritual realm. According to a founding member of the Christian Community, Friedrich Rittelmeyer, he and the other founders were inspired by Steiner.

In 1939 in London, Evelyn Capel became the first English woman priest of The Christian Community to celebrate the sacraments. After World War II, she helped reestablish Christian Community congregations in Germany, as well as expand its foothold to South Africa.

In Nazi Germany, The Christian Community came under state surveillance, but Reichsminister of Church Affairs Hanns Kerrl opposed an outright ban on the group. Despite Reinhard Heydrich's misgivings about the church, police reports consistently found nothing objectionable about its activities or practices and new congregations were established in Cologne and Stuttgart between 1938 and 1939. Nonetheless, following the departure of Rudolf Hess for Britain in 1941, a national purge against perceived occult tendencies was initiated, the Christian Community banned, and its leader Emil Bock imprisoned due to the community's alleged "Masonic activities".

The first Christian Community congregation in the United States was established in New York in 1948.

== Beliefs ==
According to James B. Robinson, a professor of religious studies at the University of Northern Iowa, the Christian Community "emphasizes freedom of thought and reflection within the framework of Christian symbolism". Frank Hörtreiter, the organization's public relations officer, has written that the "Christian Community does not have any beliefs". Hörtreiter explains that the Christian Community relies on the New Testament for the conduct of its sacraments and as a source for use in sermons and discussions, but individual members develop and hold their own beliefs "freely as convictions born out of their own experience". Clergy are free to minister as they see fit and their sermons are understood to represent only their individual feelings and not the doctrine of the community or the congregation.

The Christian Community practices open communion.

== Organization ==
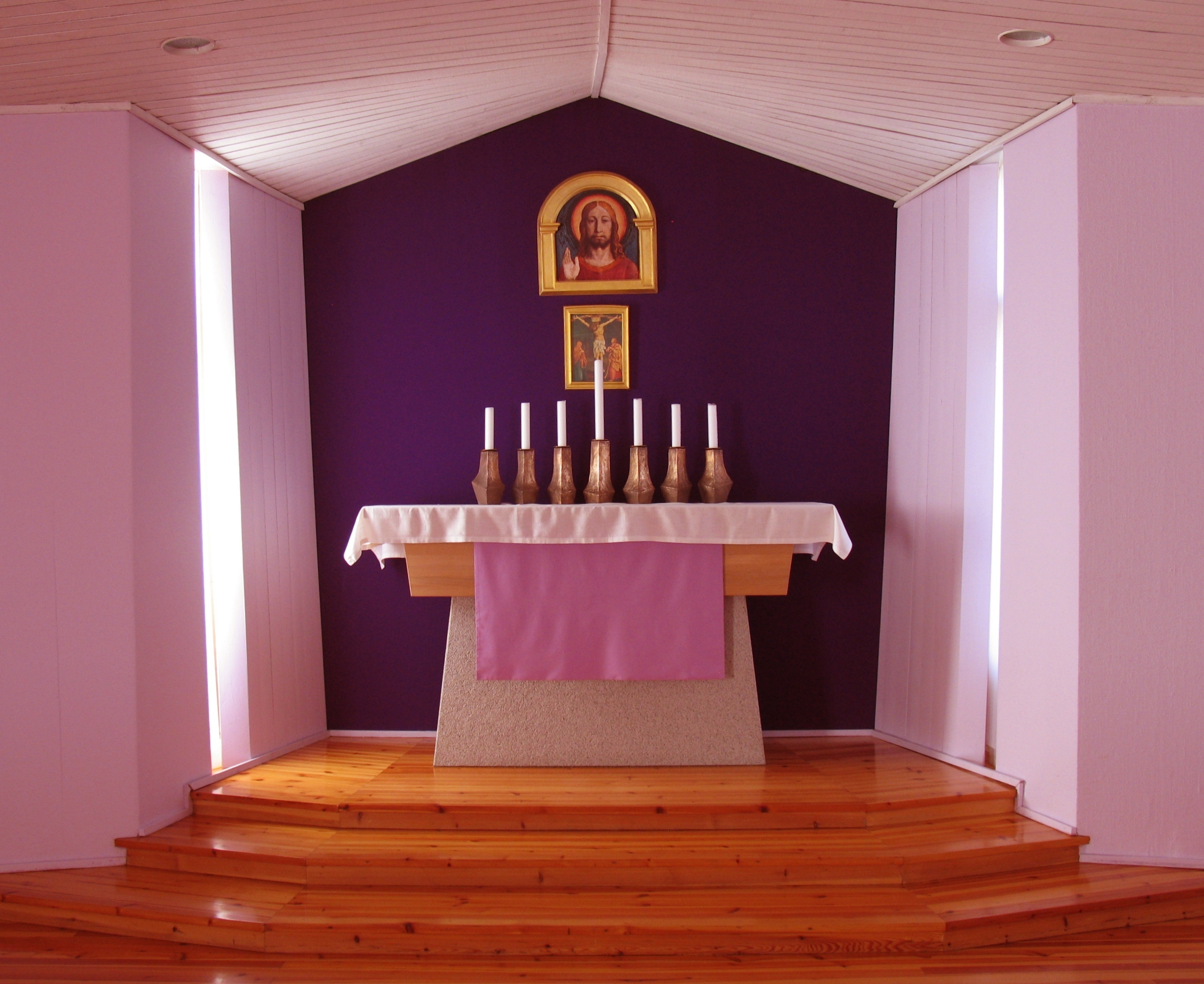
Altar in a Christian Community congregation in Helsinki, Finland

The Christian Community has a modified congregational polity in which each congregation, of which there are approximately 200, is governed by its own members and is financially independent from the organization as a whole. Priests assemble at the national and international levels in synods and elect a coordinator from among their own number. The Christian Community is globally headed by the Erzoberlenker, a priest whose office is located in Stuttgart, Germany.

The Christian Community's clergy, referred to as priests, are ordained by national synods upon completion of six months of instruction in one of its three seminaries, followed by an internship with an active priest in a congregation. Both men and women are ordained. The Christian Community does not claim Apostolic succession.

=== Ecumenical and external relations ===
The Christian Community is one of several self-identifying Christian faiths, including Mormonism and the Salvation Army, whose baptisms are not considered valid by the Roman Catholic Church, according to the list of the Archdiocese of Cincinnati website. The Evangelical Church in Germany also does not accept the Christian Community's baptisms, but neither does it deny its Christianity. A study commissioned by the World Council of Churches in 1950 recommended it be accepted into membership in the organization; its application was ultimately refused. The community itself states it operates "without attachment to any existing church or ecumenical movement".

Many members of the Christian Community are also members of the Anthroposophical Society and there are informal ties between the two groups. However, it is a legally distinct organization.

== Notable adherents ==
- Maria Darmstädter
- Ernst Robert Fiechter
- Johannes Weyrauch

== See also ==
- Gnosticism
- Liberal Catholic Church
