= Friedrich Rittelmeyer =

German minister and theologian

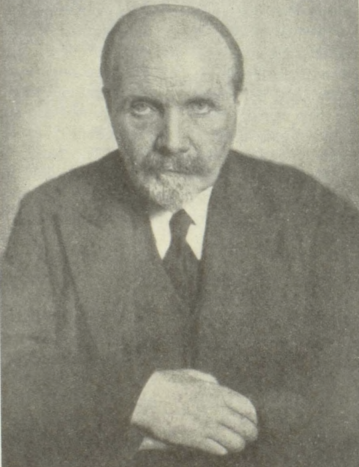
- Born: 5 October 1872; Dillingen an der Donau
- Died: 23 March 1938 (aged 65); Hamburg
- Occupation: Theologian
- Spouse: Julie Kerler (m. 1904)

Friedrich Rittelmeyer (5 October 1872 – 23 March 1938) was a Lutheran German minister, theologian and the principal founder and first leader of The Christian Community. Rittelmeyer came to prominence in the early 20th century as a leading academic liberal theologian and priest in Germany and wrote several books that advocated a socially engaged "Christianity of deeds" (Tatchristentum). During the First World War he eventually became one of the most high-profile clergymen in Germany to publicly oppose the war. From the 1910s his thinking was gradually influenced by the philosopher Rudolf Steiner, and in 1922 a group of mainly Lutheran priests and theology students led by Rittelmeyer founded The Christian Community as an ecumenically oriented Christian community inspired by Steiner's writings; The Christian Community is primarily a liturgical community with only a loose creed, and for that reason rejects Christian dogmas. Rittelmeyer saw it as a continuation of the liberal Christian tradition of which he was the foremost representative in Germany in the early 20th century.

== Life ==
Rittelmeyer grew up in Frankish Schweinfurt as the son of a Lutheran priest. From 1890 Rittelmeyer studied philosophy and Protestant theology at the University of Erlangen and the University of Berlin. Among his teachers were Adolf von Harnack and Julius Kaftan, and later Oswald Külpe, who encouraged him to write his dissertation on Friedrich Nietzsche. In 1903 he defended his doctoral dissertation in Lutheran theology at the University of Leipzig.

He also went on a study trip to meet theologians and socially engaged ministers of the time, as well as members of the Moravian Church. From 1895 to 1902 he was a priest at the St.-Johannis-Kirche in Würzburg, from which in 1903 he took up the preachership of Heilig-Geist-Kirche in Nuremberg. There he married Julie Kerler on 5 April 1904. Rittelmeyer worked and closely collaborated with Christian Geyer (1862–1929), the head preacher of the Sebalduskirche, and the pair produced two joint volumes of sermons. Around 1910 they both led discussions with the Bavarian church council on a liberal interpretation of the Bible and the denomination.

In 1916 Rittelmeyer was sent to the Neue Kirche in Berlin, working as preacher there. At first gripped by nationalist enthusiasm, he soon came to oppose the First World War and with 4 other Berlin theologians signed a proclamation of peace and understanding on the occasion of Reformation Day (October 1917).

The Nuremberg school teacher Michael Bauer in 1910 enabled Rittelmeyer to have his first encounter with Rudolf Steiner, the founder of anthroposophy. Rittelmeyer described the encounter and discussed Steiner's personality and work in his Meine Lebensbegegnung mit Rudolf Steiner (Rudolf Steiner Enters my Life). In the Christengemeinschaft he established in September 1922, Rittelmeyer acted as its first Kultushandlungen (Priesterweihe der Begründenden und Altarsakrament). He was the first "Erzoberlenker" of the "Movement for Religious Revival" (another term for the Christengemeinschaft) and from its base in Stuttgart was its leading envoy right up to his death. Under National Socialism, he carried out a permanent balancing act: between critical intellectual discussion with Nazism in numerous publications on the one hand and his task of enabling a survival strategy for the Christengemeinschaft (for which he felt responsible) on the other.
