= Duke Mansion =

Duke Mansion may refer to:

- Benjamin N. Duke House in New York City
- James B. Duke House in New York City
- James Buchanan Duke House in Charlotte, North Carolina, US
