= Census of the Reception of Antique Art and Architecture =

The Census of Antique Works of Art and Architecture Known in the Renaissance (abbreviated Census) is an interdisciplinary research project dedicated to the study of the reception of antiquity in the Renaissance. At the heart of the project is its scholarly database recording the antique works of art and architecture known in the Renaissance in relation with the early-modern sources documenting them. The project is based at the Institute of Art and Visual History at the Humboldt University of Berlin.

== Scope ==
The Census project came about as a means to acquire more clarity about the actual knowledge of antiquity of Renaissance artists. Since its inception, the project has therefore pursued the goal of registering all antique monuments known in the Renaissance and the Renaissance documents relating to them. After focusing on figurative art and its reception up until 1527 in the early phase, the temporal limit was later moved to around 1600 and other classes of art, mainly architecture, were included. In 2015, the Census database contained approximately 15,000 records of antique monuments as well as approximately 36,000 visual and written sources from the Renaissance and it is still being extended today. The ancient monuments cover sculpture, architecture, epigraphs, coins, paintings and mosaics. The Renaissance documents include drawings, prints, sculptures, paintings and medals as well as collection inventories, travelogues, artists' biographies and archival documents.

Through collaborations with neighbouring projects such as Corpus Winckelmann and Corpus Medii Aevi, the time span covered in the Census database today extends beyond the Renaissance to the Middle Ages on the one hand, and to the 18th century on the other.

== History ==
The Census was founded in 1946 at the Warburg Institute in London as a cooperation project with the Institute of Fine Arts at New York University. The project was initiated by the art historians Fritz Saxl and Richard Krautheimer and the archaeologist Karl Leo Heinrich Lehmann who sought after a reliable research tool for a better understanding of the afterlife of antiquity in the Renaissance. From 1947 the archaeologist Phyllis Pray Bober helped with the realization of this idea by developing an index card system. In addition to information on dating, authorship, iconography, etc., the ancient monuments were recorded together with the corresponding Renaissance documents and sorted alphabetically and by genre. Initially, the compilation was restricted to antique sculpture and its early-modern documentation. Since 1954 the handwritten card entries were supplemented by reproductions from the Warburg Institute’s Photographic Collection.

In 1957, Ruth Rubinstein joined the Census at the Warburg Institute and became the second long-standing protagonist besides Bober, who had always worked for the project in New York. Since then, two corresponding index card systems and photographic collections were filed in New York and London. Over time, a number of critical editions of Renaissance sketchbooks after the antique based on research done with the Census were produced. One of the most important publications that arose within the Census project was Bober’s and Rubinstein’s Renaissance Artists and Antique Sculpture: A Handbook of Sources, first published in 1986.

In the late 1970s, the idea was born to convert the analogue index card system into a computer application. Since 1981, the first Census database was designed and created within the newly launched Art History Information Program of the J. Paul Getty Trust. Together, German art historian and archaeologist Arnold Nesselrath, newly appointed director of the Census project, and American programmer Rick Holt developed an object-relational data model and a database software for UNIX systems, which allowed to access data not only from the monuments file but from the documents file as well, as from authority files for places, persons, etc. At the same time, the Bibliotheca Hertziana (Max Planck Institute for Art History in Rome) became a host institution of the Census and the project’s scope was extended to the reception of ancient architecture in the Renaissance.

After a productive decade of data entry both in London and in Rome, a newly developed retrieval system for the Census database was publicly introduced at the Warburg Institute in 1992. In 1995, after Horst Bredekamp had successfully campaigned for the project’s integration into the art history department of Humboldt University, the Census moved to Berlin. Additional funding for the project was obtained from the Federal Ministry of Education and Research. In the following years, the database was converted to the MS-DOS-based database system Dyabola. This allowed for data entry using several personal computers within a local area network, and, in 1998, for the first time publication of the database as a PC application distributed on CD-ROM (later on DVD), supplemented by annual updates. The first rudimentary internet version of the Census database was available to subscribers from 2000 onwards.

After the financial support from the Federal Ministry of Education and Research had ended, additional funding was obtained through the Academies Programme of the Union of German Academies of Sciences and Humanities in 2003 and the Census became a long-term project of the Berlin-Brandenburg Academy of Sciences and Humanities, who cooperated with the Humboldt University’s project until the end of 2017. During this time, the database software was completely renewed once again, this time into a browser-based web application. Using a highly individualised version of the digital asset management system Easydb, the Census has been accessible online with open access since 2007.

In June 2020, U.S. art historian Kathleen Christian took over as director of the Census. In 2021-22 the Census is upgrading its database software, which will lead to a new user interface. Following upon a pilot project carried out at the Berlin-Brandenburg Academy of Sciences and Humanities and funded by the Senatskanzlei Berlin, the current focus is also on the goal of making the Census data into Linked Open Data.

== Publications ==
Since 1999, the Census annually publishes the multilingual periodical Pegasus – Berliner Beiträge zum Nachleben der Antike. The journal serves as a forum for all disciplines concerned with the reception of antiquity and broadens the view to all post-antique periods. In addition, research results emerging directly from the work with the Census database are presented here.

Furthermore, the book series Cyriacus – Studien zur Rezeption der Antike is edited by the Census together with the Winckelmann Society (Stendal) and the Winckelmann Institute of Classical Archeology at Humboldt University of Berlin. It serves as a publication platform for conference proceedings and monographs.

== Cooperations ==
The Census is cooperating with the projects Corpus Winckelmann and Corpus Medii Aevi, which document the reception and transformations of antiquity of other periods within the same database.

The Corpus Winckelmann or Corpus of Antique Works of Art Known by Johann Joachim Winckelmann and his Contemporaries is a database curated by the Winckelmann Society (Stendal) and collects the written and visual documents of the 17th and 18th centuries and especially Johann Joachim Winckelmann's text quotations referring to specific ancient monuments.

The Corpus Medii Aevi is a project of the Adolph Goldschmidt Centre for the Study of Romanesque Sculpture. Here lies the focus on medieval works of art, that show the adaptation and transformation of antique imagery and motives during the Middle Ages.
