= Pilot (Dirty Sexy Money) =

- Dirty Sexy Money episode
- Episode no.: Season 1 Episode 1
- Directed by: Peter Horton
- Written by: Craig Wright
- Production code: 100
- Original air date: September 26, 2007

Episode chronology
← Previous —	Next → "The Lions"

"Pilot" is the first episode of the ABC television series, Dirty Sexy Money. The episode was written by Craig Wright and was directed by Peter Horton. It originally aired on Wednesday, September 26, 2007.

== Episode recap ==
The first episode introduces the notorious Darlings, the richest family in New York City.

The show begins as Nick George (Peter Krause) is making his way to his father's funeral. His father had been the family attorney for the Darlings. Unfortunately, Nick's father had recently died in a plane crash. Nick is shown to resent the time his father spent with the Darlings while he was growing up. Patrick "Tripp" Darling III (Donald Sutherland) lures Nick to replace his father with a large salary and ten million dollars for a charity foundation. Other Darling family members are introduced including: Jill Clayburgh as Letitia Darling; William Baldwin as Patrick Darling IV; Natalie Zea as Karen Darling; Glenn Fitzgerald as Reverend Brian Darling; Seth Gabel as Jeremy Darling; Samaire Armstrong as Juliet Darling, and Zoe McLellan as Lisa George.

This episode also lays the foundation for future relationship issues. Specifically, Letitia Darling is said to have had a forty-year affair with Nick's father. Reverend Brian Darling resents Nick because of the affair, which is common knowledge to the Darlings. Nick doesn't find out until Karen Darling informs him. Also, Patrick Darling IV is engaged in an adulterous relationship with a male to female transgender person. Reverend Brian Darling has an illegitimate son, who he is trying to get into a prestigious school. However, the school will only accept the child if he formally accepts the child as his own. Jeremy Darling has drug and gambling problems. Karen Darling still has feelings for Nick and a fiancé Freddie who is using her for her money. Freddie will be her fourth husband. Juliet Darling is an aspiring actress, but it is said that she has no talent. She finds out that her father paid a director to give her a role, and she tries to overdose. Juliet moves out to find freedom.

== Reception ==
Eric Goldman of IGN called the show "incredibly funny" and said the pilot episode for the series was "great, striking just the right winking tone". He said that even though the characters were "intentionally amped up and extreme", the cast managed "to keep them nicely believable, even amongst their ridiculous behavior". He gave the episode 9.2 out of 10.

== Production ==
The pilot was filmed primarily in New York City during March and April 2007. The James B. Duke House (now home to New York University's Institute of Fine Arts) was the original set for the Darlings' townhouse; however, after ABC ordered the first season, several scenes had to be reshot to adjust to the new LA sets that would be used for the rest of the season's production. For this reason, the interiors of the Darlings' house jump somewhat incongruously from ornate marble and wood (Duke House) to extremely modern and low-ceilinged (LA sets).
