= Laclotte =

Laclotte is a French surname. Notable people with the surname include:

- Étienne Laclotte (1728–1812), French architect
- Michel Laclotte (1929–2021), French art historian and museum director
