= Phyllis Pray Bober =

American art historian, professor (1920–2002)

- Born: Phyllis Barbara Pray; December 2, 1920; Portland, Maine, US
- Died: May 30, 2002 (aged 81); Ardmore, Pennsylvania, US
- Spouse: Harry Bober (1943–1973, divorce)
- Partner: Ted Barnett (?–2002, death)
- Children: 2

Academic background
- Education: Wellesley College, New York University Institute of Fine Arts
- Thesis: Studies in Roman Provincial Sculpture (1946)
- Doctoral advisor: Karl Leo Heinrich Lehmann

Academic work
- Institutions: Wellesley College (1947–1949), New York University (1947–1950; 1954–1973), Massachusetts Institute of Technology (1951–1953), Bryn Mawr College (1973–1991)

Phyllis Pray Bober (December 2, 1920 – May 30, 2002) was an American art historian, scholar, author and professor at Bryn Mawr College. She specialized in Renaissance art, classical antiquity, and she was a scholar in culinary history.

== Early life and education ==
Phyllis Barbara Pray was born on December 2, 1920, in Portland, Maine, to parents Lea Arlene (née Royer) and Melvin Francis Pray who were of French-Canadian ancestry. She attended Cape Elizabeth High School, graduating in 1937. In 1941, she received her B.A. degree in Art with a minor in Greek from Wellesley College. In 1943, she received a M.A. degree from New York University Institute of Fine Arts (NYU/IFA), studying under Karl Leo Heinrich Lehmann.

Phyllis Pray and Harry Bober married in 1943, he was a medievalist student in her graduate school. Her marriage to Harry Bober ended in divorce in 1973, together they had two sons.

In 1946, Bober completed her Ph.D. in Archaeology at New York University Institute of Fine Arts. Her dissertation was titled, Studies in Roman Provincial Sculpture (1946), her doctoral advisor was Karl Leo Heinrich Lehmann. After graduation she travelled with Harry Bober to Europe for the first time, visiting France, Belgium, and London.

== Career ==
In 1947, the Bobers were at the Warburg Institute of the University of London, and at the suggestion of Fritz Saxl, she started working on the Census of Antique Works of Art and Architecture Known in the Renaissance. This turned into a monumental project that spanned over 40 years of work by Bober.

From 1947 until 1949, she was a professor at Wellesley College. In 1948–1949, she worked for New York University (NYU) on the excavation in Samothrace, Greece. In 1949–1950, she was hired to teach Fine Art at NYU. From 1951 until 1954, she worked at the Farnsworth Art Museum, as well as teaching at Massachusetts Institute of Technology (MIT). From 1954 until 1973, she returned to working at NYU in a variety of career roles including research associate (1954–1973), adjunct associate professor of fine arts (1965), professor of fine arts (1967), chair of the department of fine arts (1967–1973) and work on another Samothrace excavation (1972).

In 1973, after her divorce, she accepted a role at Bryn Mawr College, as the dean of the Graduate School of Arts and Sciences, and as a professor of art history and classical and Near Eastern archaeology. She retired from Bryn Mawr as Leslie Clark Professor in the Humanities professor emerita in 1991.

She enjoyed hosting large dinner parties and giving lectures that educated culinary history and recreated past historical cuisines. This included a college lecture that had an entire wild boar roasted in an oven to mimic a Roman feast, and a lecture on the use of marijuana in cooking used during the Italian Renaissance. In her book, Art, Culture, and Cuisine: Ancient and Medieval Gastronomy (1999) she explored prehistoric recipes, alongside reflections of art history and archaeology.

In 1979, Bober was awarded the Guggenheim Fellowship for her work in Fine Art Research.

She served as president (1988–1990) of the College Art Association (CCA). Bober was elected in 1995 to the Accademia Nazionale dei Lincei in Rome, to the American Philosophical Society in 1999 and to the Dames d'Escoffier in 1995.

She died at age 81, on May 30, 2002, in her home in Ardmore, Pennsylvania.

== Publications ==
- Bober, Phyllis Pray (1999). Art, Culture and Cuisine: Ancient and Medieval Gastronomy. University of Chicago Press. ISBN 9780226062532.
- Bober, Phyllis Pray; Rubinstein, Ruth; Woodford, Susan (2010). Renaissance Artists & Antique Sculpture: A Handbook of Sources. Volume 62 of Studies in Medieval and Early Renaissance Art History Series. Brepols Publishers. ISBN 9781905375608.

== See also ==
- Ancient Roman cuisine
- Oxford Symposium on Food and Cookery
- Women in the art history field
