= James B. Duke House =

Mansion in Manhattan, New York

- U.S. National Register of Historic Places
- New York State Register of Historic Places
- New York City Landmark
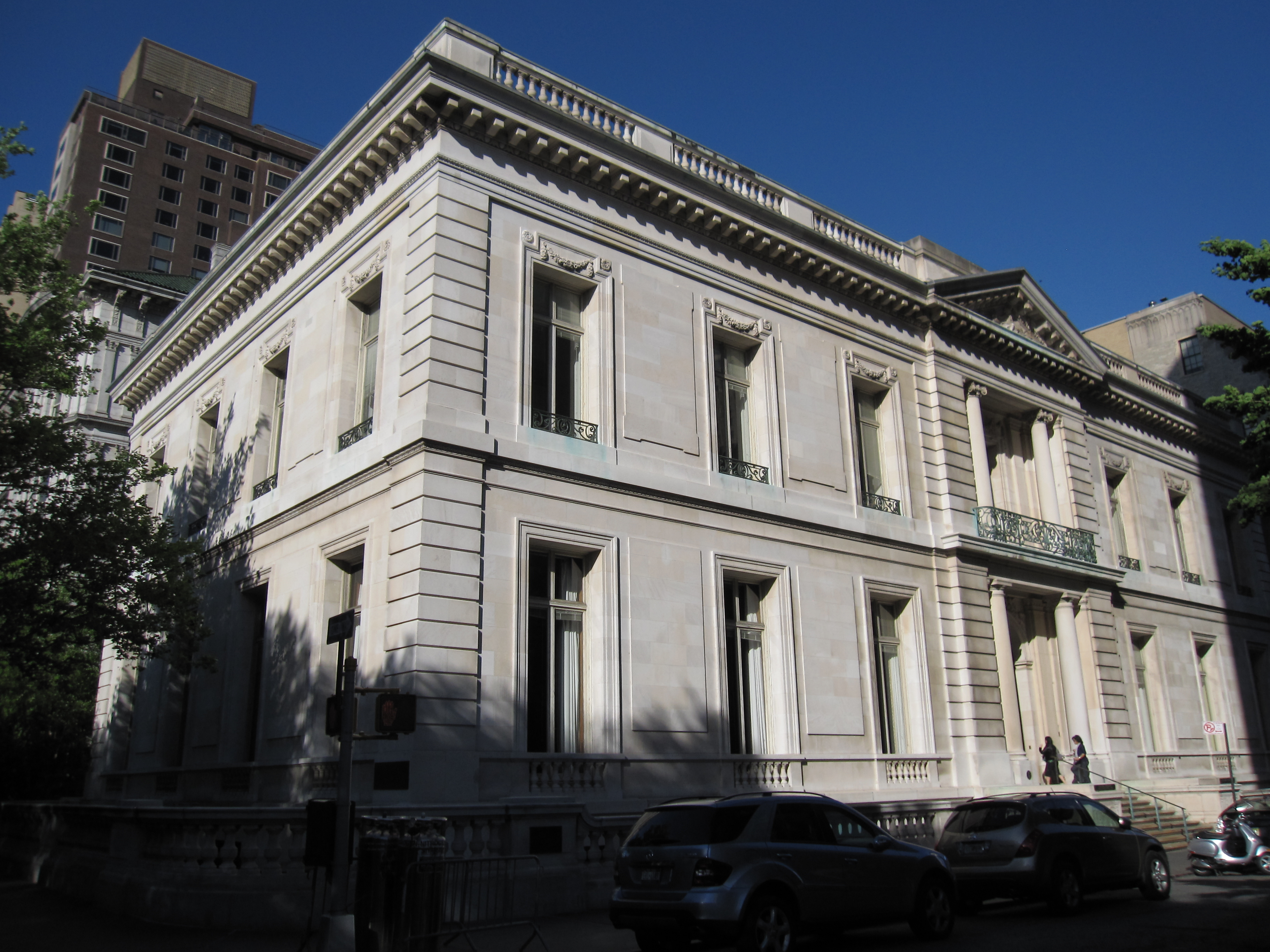
- Interactive map of James B. Duke House
- Location: 1 E. 78th St., Manhattan, New York City
- Coordinates: 40°46′35″N 73°57′50″W
- Area: 13,325 ft^{2} (1,237.9 m^{2})
- Built: 1909–1912
- Architect: Horace Trumbauer
- Architectural style: French Classical/Louis XV
- NRHP reference No.: 77000956
- NYSRHP No.: 06101.001688
- NYCL No.: 0668

Significant dates
- Added to NRHP: November 10, 1977
- Designated NYSRHP: June 23, 1980
- Designated NYCL: September 15, 1970

The James B. Duke House is a mansion at 1 East 78th Street, on the northeast corner of Fifth Avenue, on the Upper East Side of Manhattan in New York City. The building was designed by Horace Trumbauer, who drew heavily upon the design of Château Labottière in Bordeaux. Constructed between 1909 and 1912 as a private residence for businessman James Buchanan Duke and his family, the building has housed the New York University (NYU)'s Institute of Fine Arts since 1959.

The house has a limestone facade and was designed to look like a two-story structure from the street. An attic story is placed behind the balustrade on roof level. The house generally contains long windows and high ceilings and has a portico in the middle of the 78th Street facade. The interior of the first floor is designed in the French Classical style and consists of four large corner rooms, used as classrooms, which surround a main entrance hall. The second floor originally contained eight bedrooms while the third floor had servants' quarters; these later served respectively as a library and offices. The basement had service rooms, later converted into laboratories.

The James B. Duke House replaced the 1880s-era Henry H. Cook mansion. When Duke died in 1925, his wife Nanaline and daughter Doris continued to live in the house until 1958, when they donated the house to NYU. The New York City Landmarks Preservation Commission designated 1 East 78th Street as an official landmark in 1970, and it was added to the National Register of Historic Places in 1977.

== Site ==
The James B. Duke House is at 1 East 78th Street on the Upper East Side of Manhattan in New York City. It is on the northeast corner of 78th Street to the south and Fifth Avenue to the west, directly across Fifth Avenue from Central Park. The land lot covers 13,325 square feet (1,237.9 m^{2}) with a frontage of 82.17 feet (25.05 m) on Fifth Avenue and 150 feet (46 m) on 78th Street. The house is largely rectangular in plan, except at the northeast corner, where the house protrudes slightly on the north side. Nearby sites include the Payne Whitney House and the Isaac D. Fletcher (now Harry F. Sinclair) House to the north, the Stuyvesant Fish House to the east, and 960 Fifth Avenue to the south.

The city block between Fifth Avenue, Madison Avenue, and 78th and 79th Streets was part of the Lenox family farm until 1877, when Marcellus Hartley bought the block for $420,000. The railroad magnate Henry H. Cook acquired the site for $500,000 in 1880. and owned it for the remainder of the 19th century. Cook built a house on the southwest corner of the block in 1883. The house was made of sandstone and marble. During that house's construction, Cook had not set a deadline or a fixed budget; when he came across any features he disliked, he ordered contractors to remove or modify these features. This contributed to the house's stature as one of the area's most lavish dwellings. Cook intended the block to house first-class residences, not high-rises, and only sold lots for the construction of private dwellings. By the early 1910s, the value of the land had increased to $6 million. Through the early 2000s, the block of Fifth Avenue remained largely intact, compared to other parts of Fifth Avenue's "Millionaire's Row".

== Architecture ==
The James B. Duke House was designed in the French Classical/Louis XV style by Horace Trumbauer. Built for the family of James Buchanan Duke, it has served as a building for the New York University (NYU)'s Institute of Fine Arts since around 1959. Trumbauer drew heavily upon the design of French architect Etienne Laclotte's Château Labottière, built in 1773 in Bordeaux. Because Trumbauer did not have a formal architectural education, he delegated the details of his designs to other architects working for him. In particular, the Duke mansion was one of the early works of African American architect Julian Abele. The mansion itself measures 72 by 140 feet (22 by 43 m) and is freestanding, being surrounded by open space on all sides.

Comparing the house to the Edward S. Harkness House at 1 East 75th Street, Paul Goldberger wrote that the Duke House seemed "overwhelming". Conversely, Henry Hope Reed Jr. praised the house's "monumentality in what is, for New York, a low building". The historian Mosette Broderick wrote that the Duke House was reminiscent of the Fletcher House on the same block.

=== Facade ===
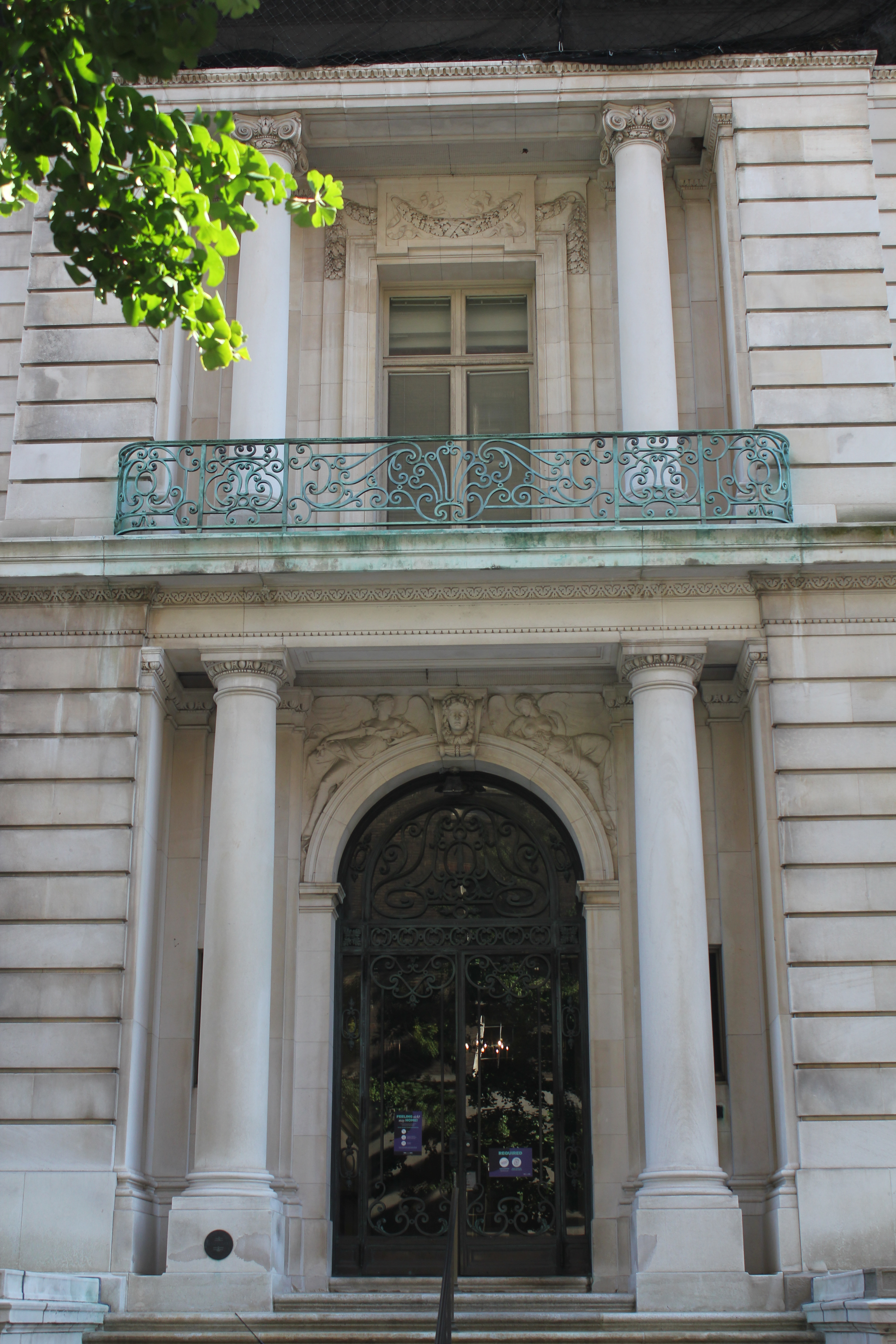
Entrance portico detail

The facade is made of limestone, which is designed in a fine quality that looks like marble. From the street, the house was designed to look like a two-story structure. An attic story is placed behind the balustrade on roof level. To make the Duke mansion appear as an overscaled version of the Château Labottière, Trumbauer hid the service rooms in the basement and the servants' bedrooms in the attic. The Duke House occupies nearly its entire land lot. On Fifth Avenue, the house is slightly recessed behind an areaway. A stone balustrade separates the areaway from the sidewalk. There is a yard on the north side of the house, separating it from the Payne Whitney House at 972 Fifth Avenue directly to the north. Another alley on the east side, measuring 10 feet (3.0 m) wide, separates the Duke House from a neighboring building at 3 East 78th Street. The Duke House's facade contains seven vertical bays of openings on the south, facing 78th Street, and four bays of openings on the west, facing Fifth Avenue. The house generally contains long windows and high ceilings to give it the impression of a large mansion.

The main entrance is in the center bay on 78th Street. It contains a double-story portico flanked by vertical pilasters with quoins. The entrance is recessed within the portico and is flanked by Doric-style columns on the ground floor. It is accessed by a short flight of steps with a balustrade that contains low relief panels. Inside the opening is a set of double doors in a round-arched opening, with stone bas-reliefs in the spandrels at the top corners. The keystone above the door has a console bracket with a relief depicting a woman's head. At the second story is a balcony with an iron railing and Ionic-style columns. There is a French window behind the balcony, topped by a carved swag and a panel with a swag and ribbons. The top of the portico contains a triangular pediment supported by corbels, within which is a tympanum containing carved figures.

The remainder of the facade is similarly ornate. Each corner of the facade contains pilasters with quoins, similar to those surrounding the portico. The windows at the ground floor are surrounded by banded moldings and have balustrades at the bottom. The balustrades of each ground-story window are visually connected by band courses within the spaces between each window. On the second story, each window is surrounded by a banded molding and has a wrought-iron window guard at the bottom, as well as a carved swag atop the window. The spaces between the windows on both stories are made of stone panels in low relief, while a band course separates the floors horizontally. The facade is topped by a large entablature and a cornice supported by modillions. The entablature has talon and egg-and-dart moldings as well as a blank frieze; at the portico, the entablature projects slightly from the facade.

=== Interior ===
The house has 30 or 32 rooms in total. According to the New York City Department of City Planning, the Duke House has a gross floor area of 31,089 square feet (2,888.3 m^{2}). However, media sources have described the house as having 40,000 square feet (3,700 m^{2}). Originally, numerous artworks were displayed throughout the house. These included Portrait of Raphael Franco (Thomas Gainsborough, 1780), Portrait of Lord Peter Burrell, Lord Gwydyr (Gainsborough, 1787), and Gentleman in a Red Coat (Henry Raeburn, 1800). Many of the house's original architectural records are in the collection of Duke University Libraries.

==== First floor ====
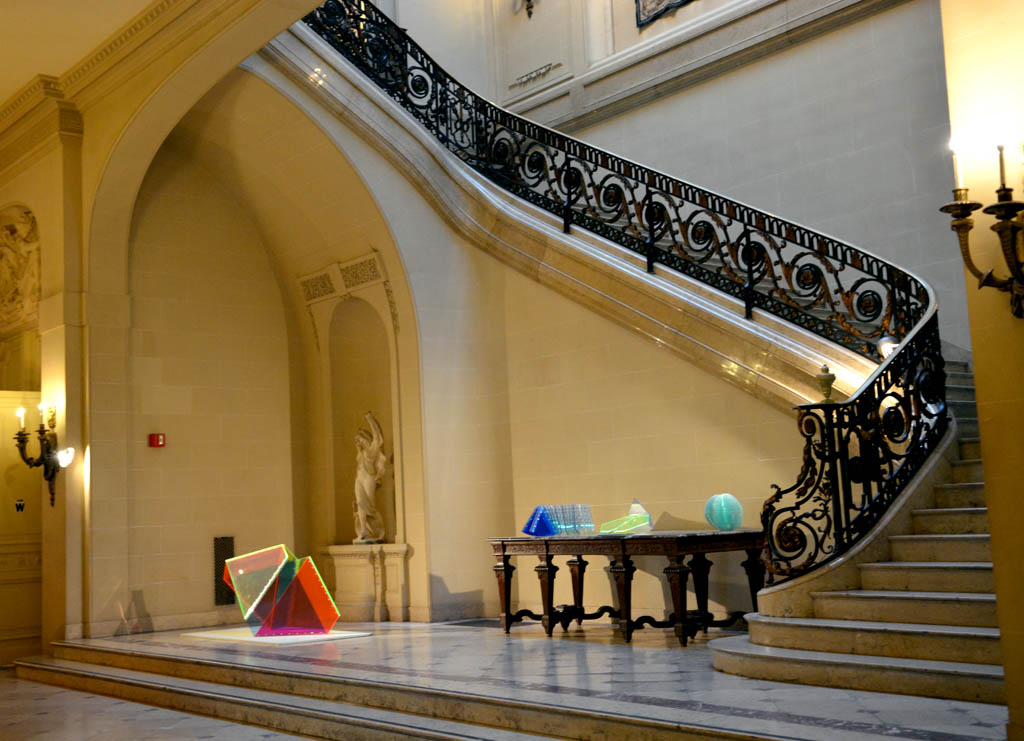
Interior staircase

The communal interiors on the first floor, which guests could visit, were designed in the French Classical style. On each side of the main entrance were reception rooms for guests. These were converted respectively to a development office to the west and a directors' office to the east. On the ground floor, the Duke mansion was designed around a grand entrance hall, officially known as the Marica Vilcek Great Hall. (Note: Marica Vilcek, the hall's namesake, was a former chairwoman of the Institute of Fine Arts' board and also the cofounder of the Vilcek Foundation.) This main hall contains stone reliefs, which are carved to resemble classical figures such as putti. The floor is made of polychrome tile. On the northern wall is a U-shaped marble staircase leading to the second floor. North of the staircase is a kitchen. A safe was originally placed next to the pantry. East of the main staircase, an additional stair leads up to the second floor and down to the basement, while an elevator leads to all stories. The elevator was originally outfitted in rose and gold decoration.

The former public rooms, including the dining, drawing, and music rooms, were arranged at the four corners of the ground floor. They retain many of the original furnishings and decorations. The library was in the southwest corner, the dining room in the northwest, the music room in the northeast, and the drawing room in the southeast. Because of the shape of the house, the music room was slightly larger than the other corner rooms. The former music room has arched openings with swags, fluted pilasters with capitals, relief panels, and an architrave with festoons and a cornice; many of the decorations are gilded. The music room has an arched opening with a small performers' balcony that contains an iron railing. As of 2020, the Loeb Room, Marble Room, Lecture Hall, and Seminar Room respectively occupy the southwest, northwest, northeast, and southeast rooms.

==== Other stories ====
The second floor had eight large bedrooms. (Note: Seven of these bedrooms are documented by the National Park Service: three each to the east and west of the main hall, as well as one in the center of the main hall. Various service rooms such as closets and bathrooms are also scattered around the second floor. An eighth room is just east of the center bedroom.) Also on the second floor was a linen room, dress closet, clothes rooms, a pantry, and bathrooms. Some of the rooms were dedicated almost exclusively to clothing when the house was used as a residence. The attic had twelve suites for servants, in addition to another linen room and a sewing room. The Institute of Fine Arts has a library in the second-floor bedrooms and faculty offices in the attic. Two stairs connect the second and third floors, one on either side of a skylight on the north side of the house.

Service rooms such as the laundry, kitchen, and servants' dining room were placed in the basement. The kitchen and servants' dining room was placed in the western side of the basement, while the laundry was in the northeast corner. Other rooms such as a pantry, storerooms, and linen rooms were arranged around a corridor connecting the kitchen and dining room with the laundry. Servants' suites were placed on smaller corridors leading off the main basement corridor. When the Institute of Fine Arts took over the building, these rooms were converted to laboratories. As of 2020, the basement has several offices. A fire stair replaced a dumbwaiter to the kitchen, but the basement furnishings remain largely intact. From the basement, another staircase and the elevator lead to the sub-basement, which has a multi-purpose room and more offices.

== History ==
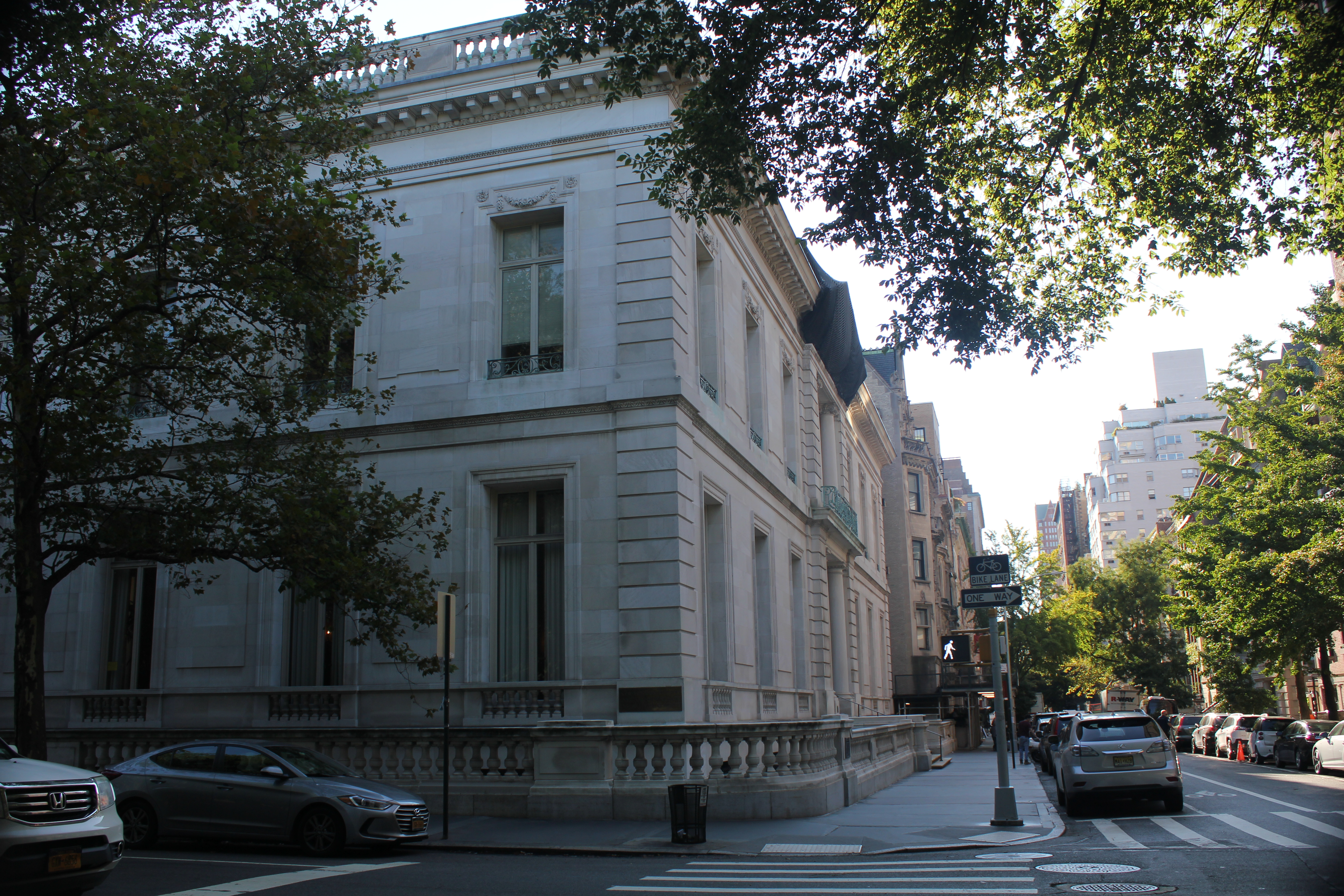
View from Fifth Avenue

James Buchanan Duke was born in North Carolina in 1856 and became a wealthy businessman during the 19th century. He grew his family's tobacco enterprise significantly, and he became president of the American Tobacco Company in 1890 after several U.S. tobacco companies merged. James and his brother Benjamin Newton Duke moved the company's headquarters to New York City in the 1900s. By the middle of the decade, James Duke was worth $50 million, owned four properties across the eastern U.S., and lived at Benjamin's house at 1009 Fifth Avenue. James moved to 4 East 52nd Street in what is now Midtown Manhattan in 1907, shortly before he married Nanaline Inman. Even after the American Tobacco Company was dissolved by antitrust action in 1911, Duke remained a wealthy businessman, organizing competing companies and founding the Southern Power Company (later Duke Power) and Duke University.

=== Construction ===
After the Dukes married, they sought to move to Fifth Avenue, where many of the city's wealthiest lived. Duke considered buying Cook's 78th Street mansion as a wedding present. Duke began negotiations for the Cook house in 1907, and discussions continued for two years. In January 1909, Duke purchased the Henry H. Cook mansion for $1.25 million. He initially planned to alter the house, with C. P. H. Gilbert designing the alterations, and borrowed $700,000 to fund the renovation. By August 1909, Duke planned to construct an entirely new residence and was already demolishing the Cook house. That house, barely 25 years old, was one of the avenue's most prominent residences, even though its interior design details had become outdated. The New York Times wrote, "Is it possible that twenty-five years hence people will be talking about the 'old' Duke house?" Many of the furnishings in the Cook mansion were sold at deep discounts: for instance, a $15,000 fireplace was sold for $300, and individual panels worth $55 were sold for $3. The demolition contractor called it "the best-built house ever torn down in New York City".

Trumbauer was hired to design a new residence there, and John T. Brady & Co. was hired as the general contractor. It is unknown why Duke selected Trumbauer specifically. Many of Duke's peers had hired McKim, Mead & White to design their own houses, and, at the time of the Duke House's construction, Trumbauer had completed few other buildings in Manhattan. In September, Duke sold a small parcel on the north side of the site, measuring 20 by 100 feet (6.1 by 30.5 m), to his neighbor William Payne Whitney. The next month, Trumbauer filed plans for a three-story Renaissance-style residence on the site, to cost $365,000. The 1910 United States census records James and Nanaline Duke as living in Benjamin's house at 1009 Fifth Avenue.

By mid-1910, the masonry at the ground story had been laid. The final design elements of the James B. Duke House were being installed by June 1912. The Duke House was one of the later mansions built on the northern section of Fifth Avenue. along with other structures such as the Andrew Carnegie Mansion, Willard D. Straight House, Otto H. Kahn House, and Felix Warburg House. All five of these houses remained in residential use for several decades and still exist in the 21st century. Had Duke not bought the old Cook house, he likely would have been forced to buy land further north in Carnegie Hill, where the Carnegie, Straight, Kahn, and Warburg mansions were located.

=== Duke residence ===
==== Early years ====
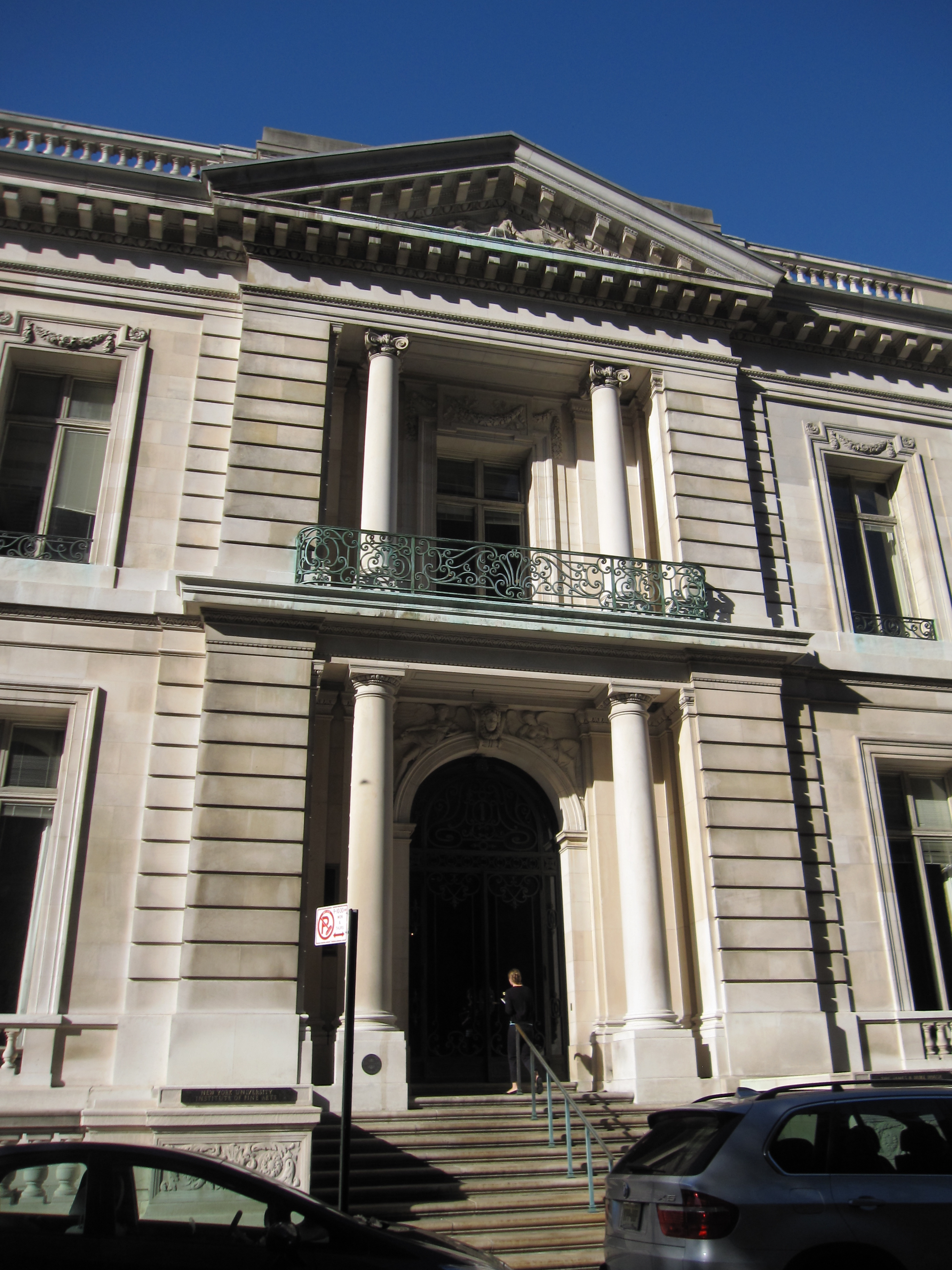
Detail of the portico

During 1912, Duke and his pregnant wife Nanaline moved into the house with their fourteen servants; the house had ultimately cost $1 million. Their only child, Doris Duke, was born the same November. Among the events the Dukes hosted in their new house was a dinner dance in March 1913. The New York Times dedicated a page in an illustrated supplement to photographs of the house, which it dubbed the "costliest home opened on Fifth Avenue within a year". According to New York state census records from 1915, the three Dukes lived with two relatives and thirteen servants. (Note: The New York Times quoted fourteen servants as living with the Dukes.) The 1920 United States census showed that all of the servants working at the house at that point had been hired after 1915, except for their 50-year-old cook Mathilda Andrews.

The 78th Street house, while spacious, was the Dukes' secondary residence; their primary residence was Duke Farms in New Jersey. Nanaline did spend significant amounts of time at the 78th Street house, but James preferred to live in his other homes after World War I. At the end of World War I, the Duke family obtained the Rough Point estate on Newport, Rhode Island, in an attempt to ingratiate themselves with New York City's high society. James Duke also obtained the Lynnwood house in Charlotte, North Carolina, and lived there in the 1920s, just before his death.

==== After James Duke's death ====
James B. Duke died at his 78th Street home on October 10, 1925, having suffered from pneumonia for several weeks. In James's will, Doris received $50 million from her father's $150 million estate (which she could access when she attained the age of majority), while Nanaline received the 78th Street house, the Rough Point estate, and the Charlotte house. Due to an unusual clause in the will, James had stipulated that these properties be sold immediately, but Doris was to be given sufficient funds to purchase the properties back. In addition, Nanaline wanted to sell the houses, while Doris objected to the sales.

Doris successfully sued her mother for control of the house in early 1927 as part of a "friendly" lawsuit. Doris wished to avoid the formality of placing the residence through an auction, which would entail having guests enter the home to assess the furnishings, potentially damaging it. The then-14-year-old Doris received both the house itself, valued at $1.6 million, and its furnishings, valued at $600,000. Doris was placed in charge of paying off the $615,000 mortgage and Nanaline in charge of interest payments on the mortgage. As a teenager, Doris continued to reside in the family house on 78th Street, referring to it as "the rock pile" in her adulthood. By the late 1920s, apartment buildings were being constructed on the adjacent blocks. This prompted Nanaline Duke to ask the New York Supreme Court in 1929 to reduce the house's valuation from $1.6 million to $970,000, citing the apartment construction.

The house was assessed at $1.5 million in 1931, prompting Nanaline to sue again to reduce the value to $975,000. When Doris Duke turned twenty-one years old in 1933, she received a substantial part of the bequest that had been held in trust for her. A little more than a year later, in February 1935, Doris married James H. R. Cromwell at the 78th Street house. Even when Doris Duke remarried to Porfirio Rubirosa in 1947, she retained ownership of the 78th Street house and several other properties. The house was mostly used by Nanaline by the 1950s, and Nanaline stayed there until 1957.

=== Institute of Fine Arts ===
==== 1950s to 1990s ====
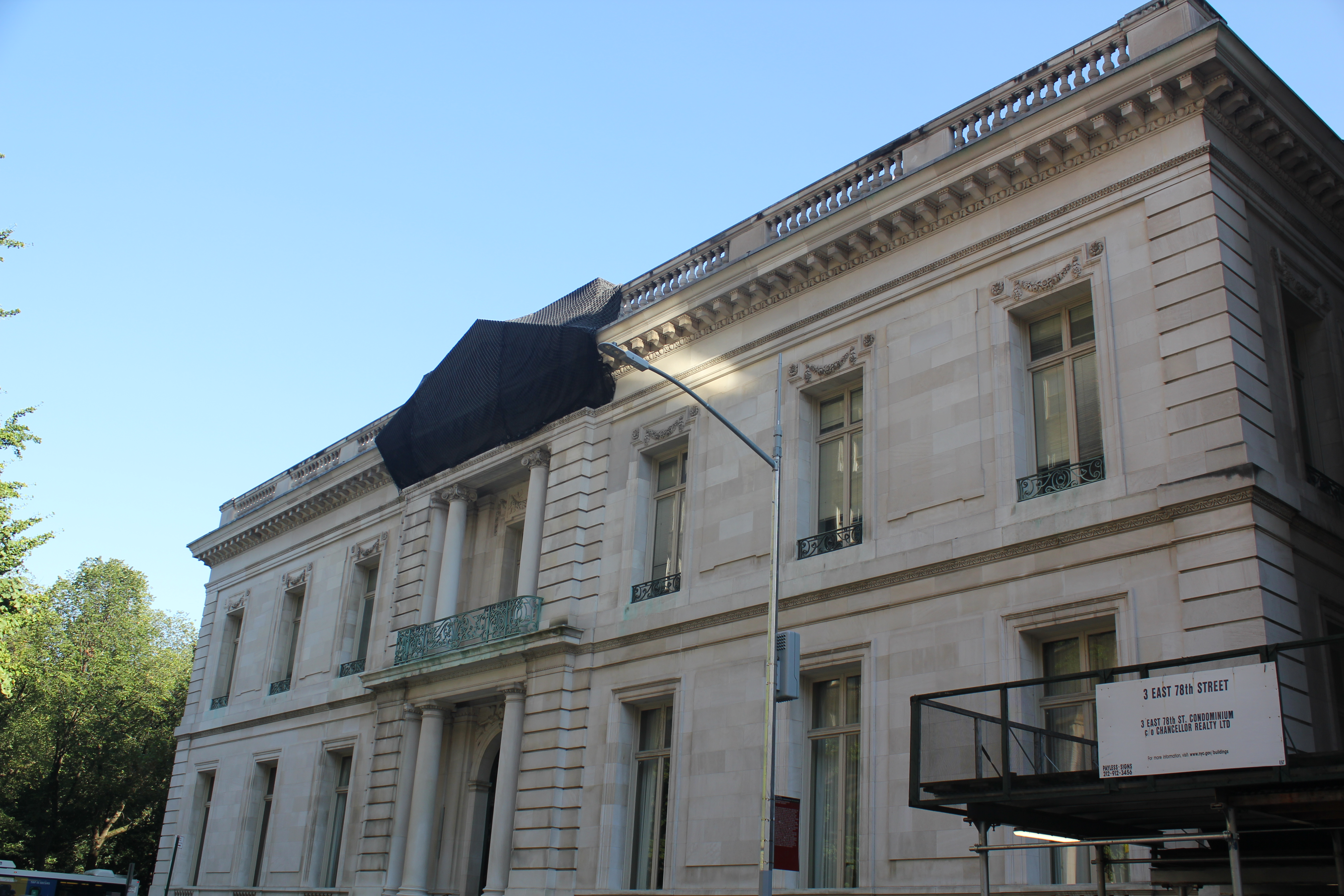
Seen from the east

In January 1958, Nanaline and Doris Duke donated the building to the NYU Institute of Fine Arts. The building was valued at the time at $1.6 million, while its furnishings were worth $600,000. The donation allowed the institute to more than double its space from 19,000 square feet (1,800 m^{2}), at their old location on 17 East 80th Street, to 40,000 square feet (3,700 m^{2}) at the Duke House. Most of the art in the mansion was moved to Rough Point. The architecture firm of Robert Venturi, Cope & Lippincott renovated the building for academic use. The renovation, Venturi's first project, involved preserving most of the interior spaces. NYU's occupancy of the Duke House preserved it for the time being, especially when other mansions on Fifth Avenue's "Millionaires' Row" were being demolished.

NYU dedicated the institute's new quarters in the Duke House in February 1959. The dedication party was reportedly the first time the house had hosted a party in twenty years. The New York Landmarks Conservancy praised the Duke House's "superb adaptive reuse" when the NYU renovation was completed. As early as 1966, the New York City Landmarks Preservation Commission (LPC) was considering designating the Duke House as part of a city historic district. The LPC designated the house as an individual landmark on September 15, 1970, calling it "one of the adornments of Fifth Avenue and one of the last reminders of the Age of Elegance". The house was added to the National Register of Historic Places on November 10, 1977. The same year, the LPC designated the house as part of the Metropolitan Museum Historic District, a collection of 19th- and early 20th-century mansions around Fifth Avenue between 78th and 86th Streets.

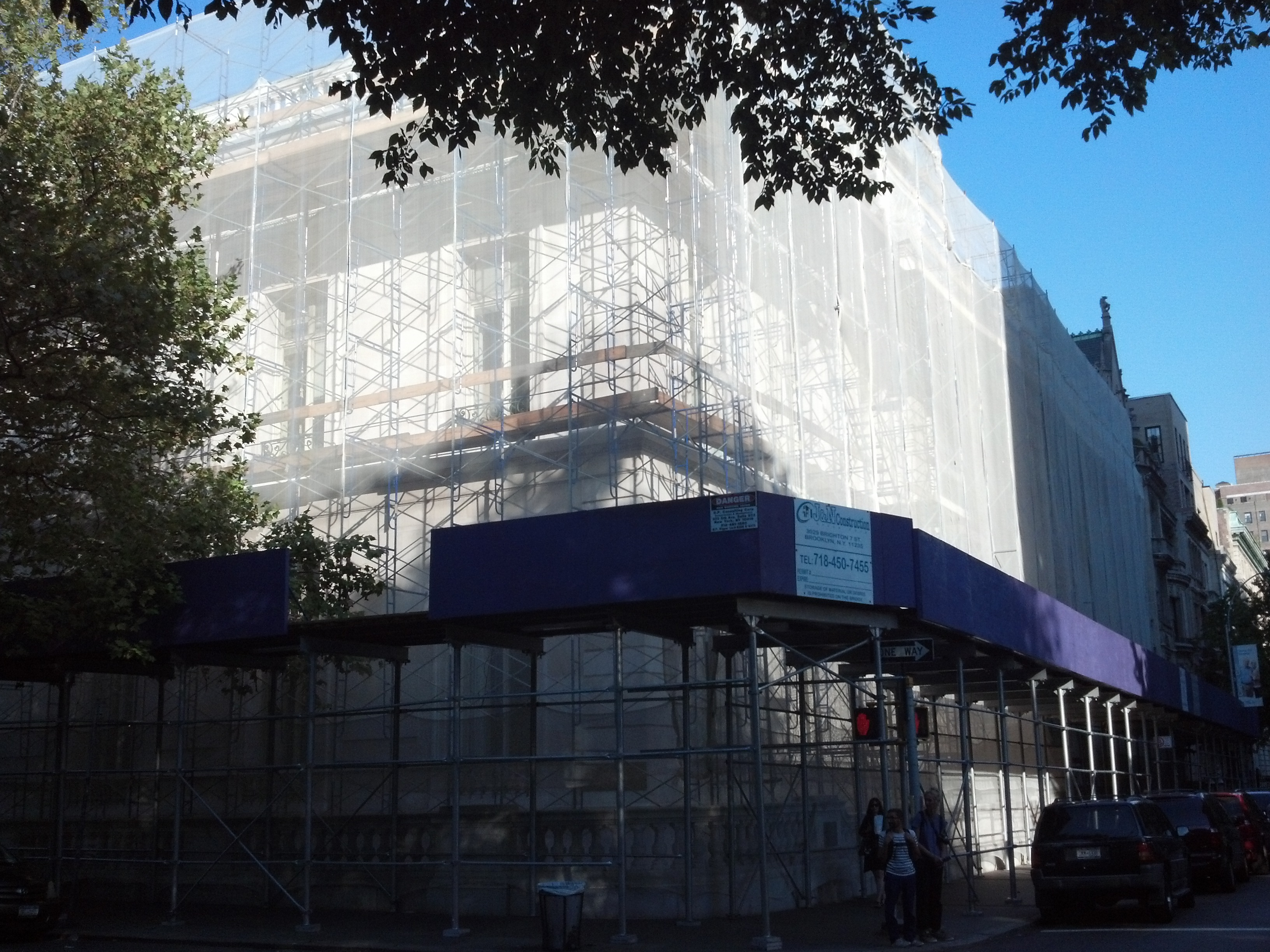
Under renovation in 2012

Richard Foster renovated the house again in the late 1970s, adding an 80,000-volume library on the second floor. John L. Loeb and the Hagop Kevorkian Fund financed the renovation, which cost $1.2 million. For his work, Foster received an award in 1978 from the Connecticut Society of Architects, and the New York Landmarks Conservancy gave the project an award for "excellence in the redesign of a landmarks building".

==== 1990s to present ====
By the 1990s, the house was visibly deteriorating, and sidewalk sheds had to be erected to protect visitors. Next door at 3 East 78th Street, former institute chairman Sheldon Solow acquired a ground-floor condominium in 1999. Solow ultimately bought two floors in the adjacent building and donated them to NYU in 2007. The space was to contain a library named after him; the library would include several thousand art and architecture books that were being stored in the James B. Duke House and other locations.

The James B. Duke House was renovated starting in 2012. The facade, roof, and basement were preserved, and the existing materials were retained as much as possible. Also in 2012, NYU started negotiating with the condominium board of the neighboring 3 East 78th Street to expand into that building. In 2014, NYU proposed creating an enclosed breezeway slightly above the alley separating the Duke House and 3 East 78th Street. The move received opposition from residential condominium owners at 3 East 78th Street, who feared the move would damage their properties. The dispute was based on the fact that, while NYU owned the ground-floor condominium in the neighboring building, it did not own the exterior wall. After a 2016 lawsuit where NYU sued 3 East 78th Street's condominium board over delays to the renovation, NYU renovated the neighboring condominium unit in 2020.

== See also ==
- List of New York City Designated Landmarks in Manhattan from 59th to 110th Streets
- National Register of Historic Places listings in Manhattan from 59th to 110th Streets
