= Harry Bober =

American art historian (1915–1988)

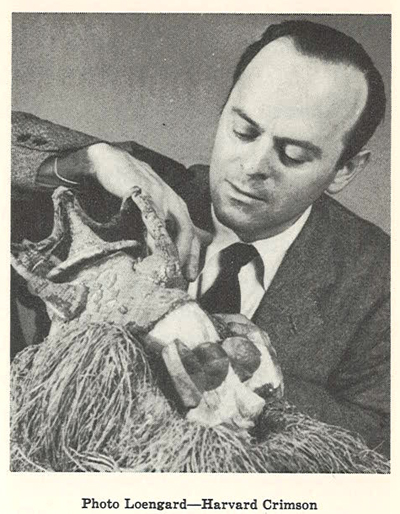
- Bober, from The Harvard Crimson c.1950s.
- Born: Abraham Herschel Bober; September 2, 1915; Brooklyn, New York, US
- Died: June 17, 1988 (aged 72); New York City, New York, US
- Occupations: art historian, university professor, author
- Spouse: Phyllis Pray Bober (1943–1973, divorce)
- Children: 2

Academic background
- Education: City College of New York, New York University
- Thesis: The Illustrations in the Printed Books of Hours, Iconographic and Stylistic Problems (1949)
- Doctoral advisor: Walter William Spencer Cook

Academic work
- Discipline: Medieval history
- Institutions: Harvard University (1951–1954), New York University Institute of Fine Arts (1954–1988)

Harry Bober (September 2, 1915 – June 17, 1988) was an American art historian, a university professor, and a writer. He was the first Avalon Professor of the Humanities a New York University (NYU). He wrote and edited several books and published numerous articles on the art, architecture and historiography of the Middle Ages and the early Renaissance period.

== Education and early life ==
Abraham Herschel Bober was born on September 2, 1915, in Brooklyn, New York. The name Harry had been a typo on his birth certificate, which he later adopted has his name. His parents were Fanny Newman and Hyman Bober, they were Jewish and from Eastern Europe, immigrating to the United States before World War I. For his high school education, he attended Boys High School.

Bober's started his study of art history at the City College of New York. In 1936, he was among the first group of students to enroll in the Fine Arts Graduate Center at New York University (NYU), this would later be known as the New York University, Institute of Fine Arts (NYU/IFA). In 1939, Bober wrote his M.A. degree thesis under Erwin Panofsky (on the subject of the Brussels Apocalypse).

He married the future art historian Phyllis Pray in 1943, which he meet while attending class at New York University. The couple divorced in 1973, together they had two sons.

He joined the U.S. Navy during World War II. After the war, Bober and his wife continued their graduate work. He received his Ph.D. from NYU in 1949. His dissertation was titled, The Illustrations in the Printed Books of Hours: Iconographic and Stylistic Problems (1949), on Medieval books of hours, his doctoral advisor was Walter William Spencer Cook.

The 1950–51 year was spent as a senior research fellow at the Warburg Institute. Then in 1954 he returned to New York University as Avalon professor at the Institute of Fine Arts in New York University. He was a founding member and first secretary (1956–1959) of the International Center for Medieval Art, for which he also helped launch Gesta, its scholarly organ. During these years Bober published several facsimile editions of medieval manuscripts for Hans P. Kraus.

== Career ==
Bober taught at Harvard University from 1951 until 1954. In 1954 he returned to New York, joining the NYU faculty. Bober was professor of medieval art at the NYU's Institute of Fine Arts (NYU/IFA) from 1954 until his death in 1988. He also taught at Queens College, Smith College, and Johns Hopkins University.

Complementing his career as an academic, he served as one of the founding members of the board of directors of the International Foundation for Art Research (IFAR).

He died from complications from liver cancer at the age of 72, on June 17, 1988, at Saint Vincent's Hospital and Medical Center in Manhattan, New York.

== Publications ==
In a statistical overview derived from writings by and about Harry Bober, OCLC/WorldCat encompasses over 110 works, in over 150 publications, in four languages, and over 1,300 library holdings.

- Bober, Harry (1940). The Brussels Apocalypse of the Bibliothèque Royale, containing also the Lumière as Lais and the Pénitence Adam (masters degree thesis). New York University, Graduate School of Arts and Sciences.
- Bober, Harry (1949). The Illustrations in the Printed Books of Hours Iconographic and Stylistic Problems (Ph.D. thesis). Walter W. S. Cook. New York University.
- Saxl, Fritz; Meier, Hans (1953). Bober, Harry (ed.). Catalogue of astrological and mythological illuminated manuscripts of the Latin Middle Ages: Manuscripts in English libraries. III, Volume 3. Warburg Institute, University of London.
- Bober, Harry; Brandt, Mortimer (1966). The Mortimer Brandt Collection of Medieval Manuscript Illuminations. Stellar Press.
