= Robert Rosenblum =

American art historian (1927–2006)

Robert Rosenblum (July 24, 1927 – December 6, 2006) was an American art historian and curator known for his influential and often irreverent scholarship on European and American art from the mid-eighteenth to the twentieth century.

== Biography ==
Rosenblum was born in New York City and studied art history at Queens College and Yale University and, in 1956, received his Ph.D. from New York University's Institute of Fine Arts.

Rosenblum's many publications include Cubism and Twentieth Century Art (1960), Transformations in Late Eighteenth Century Art (1967), Modern Painting and the Northern Romantic Tradition: Friedrich to Rothko (1975), and Nineteenth Century Art (co-authored with H.W. Janson, 1984). However, he is perhaps best known for his innovations in curatorial practice, such as his inclusion of non-canonical works and his rejection of standard chronological ordering.

Rosenblum held teaching positions at Princeton University, the University of Michigan, Yale University, Oxford University (where he was Slade Professor of Fine Art for 1972–73) and the Institute of Fine Arts at New York University. He was also the Stephen and Nan Swid Curator of Twentieth-Century Art at the Solomon R. Guggenheim Museum.

He died at his home in Greenwich Village, Manhattan, New York City, from complications of colon cancer.
