= Thomas E. Crow =

American art historian

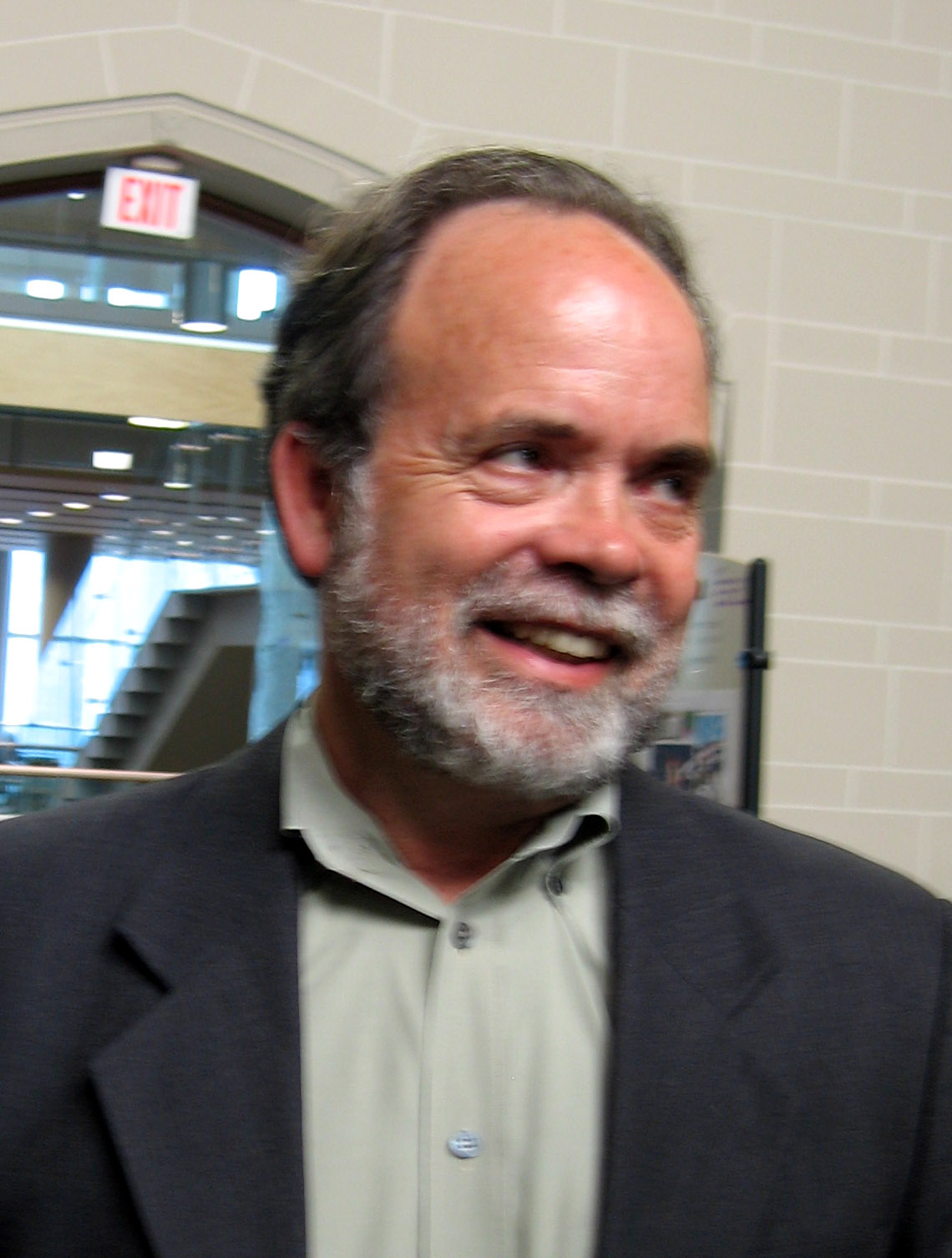
- Education: Pomona College
- Occupation: Rosalie Solow Professor of Modern Art at The Institute of Fine Arts, NYU
- Known for: History of modern art in Europe and the United States
- Notable work: Painters and Public Life in Eighteenth-Century Paris (1985), The Rise of the Sixties: American and European Art in the Era of Dissent (1996)

Thomas E. Crow (born 1948) is an American art historian and art critic who is best known for his influential writing on the role of art in modern society and culture. Since 2007, Crow has served as the Rosalie Solow Professor of Modern Art at the Institute of Fine Arts, NYU.

== Biography ==
Crow was born in Chicago in 1948, and moved to San Diego, California in 1961. He received a B.A. from Pomona College in 1969, and his M.A. in 1975 and Ph.D. in 1978, both from the University of California, Los Angeles.

In his early career, Crow focused on French art of the eighteenth and early nineteenth centuries. His work from this period includes his books Painters and Public Life in Eighteenth Century Paris (1985) and Emulation: Making Artists for Revolutionary France (1995). More recently, his work has involved modern and contemporary American and British art. This recent work includes The Long March of Pop; Art, Music, and Design 1930 to 1995 (2014) and The Hidden Mod in Modern Art: London, 1957–1969 (2020). In a return to his earlier field, he delivered the 2015 Andrew W. Mellon Lectures at the National Gallery, Washington, on the subject, "Restoration as Event and Idea: Art in Europe 1814-1820." That work was supported by a 2014-15 J.S. Guggenheim Fellowship.

Crow has held teaching positions at the California Institute of the Arts, the University of Chicago, Princeton University, the University of Michigan, Ann Arbor, the University of Sussex, Yale University and the University of Southern California. He served as director of the Getty Research Institute from 2000 to 2007, and started a new position as the Rosalie Solow Professor of Modern Art at New York University's Institute of Fine Arts in September 2007.

Crow is a contributing editor to Artforum.

== Selected publications ==
- Painters and Public Life in Eighteenth Century Paris (New Haven and London: Yale University Press, 1985)
- Emulation: Making Artists for Revolutionary France (New Haven and London: Yale University Press, 1995)
- The Rise of the Sixties: American and European Art in the Era of Dissent (New York: Harry N. Abrams, Inc., 1996)
- Modern Art in the Common Culture (New Haven and London: Yale University Press, 1996)
- The Intelligence of Art (University of North Carolina Press, 1999)
- Gordon Matta-Clark, co-authored by Thomas Crow, Corinne Diserens, Christian Kravagna and Judith Russi Kirshner (Phaidon Press, 2003)
- "Cosmic Exile: Turns in the Life and Art of Robert Smithson" in Robert Smithson, edited by Eugenie Tsai (University of California Press, 2004)
- Robert Rauschenberg: Combines, edited by Paul Schimmel (Steidl Publishing, 2006)
- The Long March of Pop; Art, Music, and Design 1930 to 1995 (New Haven and London: Yale University Press, 2015)
- The Hidden Mod in Modern Art: London, 1957–1969 (London: Paul Mellon Centre for Studies in British Art, 2020)

== Sources ==
- Crow, Thomas E. in the Dictionary of Art Historians Lee Sorensen, ed.
