= Musée des Arts Décoratifs et du Design =

French museum

Museum of Decorative Arts and Design
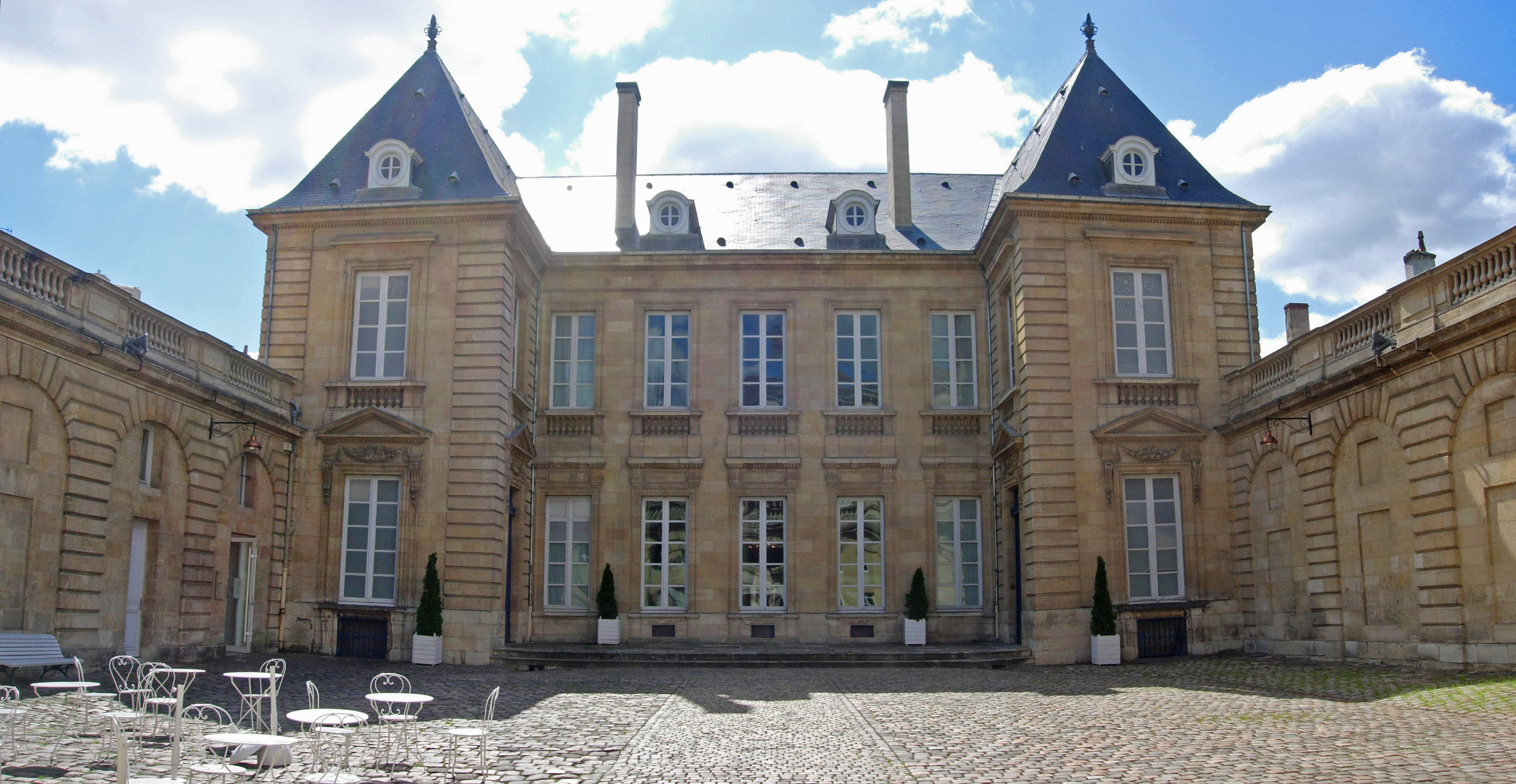
- Established: 1925 : "musée d’Art ancien" 1955 : "musée des Arts décoratifs"
- Location: 39 rue Bouffard; 33000 Bordeaux, France
- Collection size: Decorative arts, Design
- Visitors: 72,052 (2017)
- Website: madd-bordeaux.fr/en

The Museum of Decorative Arts and Design (French: Musée des Arts décoratifs et du Design) is a French museum located into a former 18th-century Bordeaux aristocratic mansion, which presents today a collection of Decorative arts and furniture. Since 2013, the museum also deals with modern design.

== Location ==
In the center of Bordeaux, close to the town hall and the square Gambetta, the museum is accessible by line B of the tramway de Bordeaux from station Gambetta-Mériadeck.

== History ==
=== Hôtel de Lalande ===
In 1778, the architect Etienne Laclotte built for the parlementarian jurist Pierre de Raymond de Lalande, the Hôtel de Lalande, one of the most beautiful townhouses in Bordeaux. Belonging to the "noblesse de robe", Raymond de Lalande used to possess, by his marriage to Jeanne de Lalande-Gayon, dame d’Urtubie, extensive holdings with slaves in the colony of Saint-Domingue (present-day Haiti).

Sold in 1828, the property of the Lalande heirs changed hands several times during the 19th century. Finally, in 1880, the city of Bordeaux acquired the Hôtel de Lalande and converted into a police and vice control headquarters. At the rear of the property, a jail was built in the former garden.

=== The museum ===
In 1925, several rooms of the Hôtel de Lalande were used to display works of art belonging to the City of Bordeaux. The first museum was called Musée d'Art ancien. The museum was obliged to close during World War II, and in 1940, the collections were crated and stored in the cellars of the Musée des Beaux-Arts (Fine Arts Museum).

On 2 July 1955, the museum reopened to the public as the Musée des Arts Décoratifs (Decorative Arts Museum). In 1984, the museum was converted to evoke a wealthy aristocratic residence, typical of the Enlightenment in Bordeaux and its reserves are located in the former prison.

In 2013, the institution was renamed the Musée des Arts décoratifs et du Design on Constance Rubini's initiative, thus indicating the wish to turn it into a major place for disseminating the culture of design. The former jail building now houses the temporary exhibitions.

== Historical Monuments ==
Both buildings, the hôtel de Lalande and the former prison, are classified as historical monuments in 2018.

== Collections ==
The museography features several reconstitutions (in the spirit of American period rooms) as well as rooms in which display cases and antique furniture exist side by side in tasteful harmony. The museum's collections had expanded, ranging from the Middle Ages to the late 18th century, and illustrating the applied arts in crafts involving wood, metal, earth and fire. In particular, the ceramics collections, through their extraordinary wealth and variety, were unsurpassed in France.
