= Walter Friedländer =

German art historian

Walter Ferdinand Friedlaender (March 10, 1873 – September 8, 1966) was a German art historian (who should not be confused with Max Jakob Friedländer).

Walter Friedlaender was the son of Sigismund Friedlaender and Anna Joachimsthal. Born in Glogau, he was taught art history by Heinrich Wölfflin and others. Among his first students was Erwin Panofsky.

He taught at the Freiburg University (1914–1933), and the Institute of Fine Arts at New York University (1935-1966).

According to architecture and art historian Rocky Ruggiero, in a seminal observation about Mannerism by Friedlaender in his work, Mannerism and Anti-mannerism in Italian Painting, he presented the most sophisticated explanation of the transition from Renaissance art into the modern subjective "-isms" that followed the Baroque synthesis of Renaissance and High Renaissance styles. The concept Friedlaender presented was that artists moved from the objective and scientific work of Leonardo Da Vinci to the subjective presentations that have followed the break with Classical styles.

Friedlaender died in New York.

== Works ==
- David to Delacroix, 1952
- Caravaggio Studies, 1955
- Mannerism and Anti-mannerism in Italian Painting, 1957
- Mannerism and Anti-mannerism in Italian Painting, 1965
- Poussin. The Library of Great Painters. 1964. Harry N. Abrams, Inc., Publishers. New York, N.Y. 204 pp.
