= Projekt Dyabola =

Projekt Dyabola (the Dyabola project) is a software for creating and browsing bibliographic data and image collections, specifically targeted to the humanities community. The program is built and maintained by the Biering & Brinkmann company of Germany, and access to a web version is available through subscription. The service is available in six languages.

== Databases ==
Currently, 15 databases are available in the online system, where the set of data contained in a database is delineated based on what organization owns the original collection being indexed. Each database contains individual records that describe published books and articles, authors, ancient objects, images, etc. The descriptive records, or metadata, are connected in various ways, such as by connecting authors with their publications, and publications with their subject descriptors. In this way, it functions similar to many integrated library systems, or citation indexing services.

=== Example: subject catalog of the German Archaeological Institute in Rome ===
This database, called the Realkatalog in German, contains an index of all the academic publications owned by the German Archaeological Institute in Rome. These publications generally cover topics about Classical Studies, i.e. the history and archaeology of the region around the Mediterranean Sea from about 800 BCE to 476 CE. The data entry for this collection began in 1990, and currently all publications from 1956 to February 2009 have been indexed. This includes about half a million titles of books and articles, one hundred thousand authors, and one million subject words describing these.

To find a record, a keyword search either across all metadata fields or restricted to one field can be performed. It is also possible to browse the hierarchical tree of subject terms to find a particular term of interest. Finally, if a user knows the local unique identifier for a source, this can be entered directly. Search results are automatically saved for future browsing.

A record about an article would contain the title, publication date, and page numbers, as well as a link to the author, the journal, any reviews of the work, and a list of subject headings. From a particular journal issue, it is possible to navigate to each of the individual articles and vice versa.

The system lacks a number of important pieces of information that would allow the user to make a relevancy judgment on the source. For example, aside from the title and a few subject headings, no information is provided about the actual content of the source. Book summaries and article abstracts are not included.

== Maintenance and access issues ==
Currently, the large amount of data that has been manually entered and interconnected represents a value-added aspect of this software. However, the requirement for manual resources restricts access to the service to those that can purchase a subscription. New models have become available over the last few years to remedy these issues. Full-text searching and automated citation interconnection, such as that begun in the Google Books and Google Scholar projects will likely eventually make this type of manually maintained database obsolete. In addition, free online citation indexing programs such as Citeulike and Connotea allow the global community to collaboratively index and catalog academic sources, using a model not unlike Wikipedia.

Starting April 2026 the project redirects to a new homepage, used as blog before at dyabola.de and offers a dual login by accessing the old database server with a dedicated login. The login to the old server instance is still possible. The new server also shows how many users are currently online.Both instances now support HTTPS.

== User interface issues ==
Since Projekt Dyabola's interface is over 20 years old, a number of weaknesses are now becoming apparent, especially when compared to similar, more modern systems. The interface is unintuitive and relies on outdated technologies and paradigms of interaction. For example, once the database is opened in a separate browser pop-up window, there is no description to indicate the contents of the dataset being searched. These screens also lack contextual help that would aid the user in understanding the available functionality. Another issue is that there are points where a user may like to return to a previous screen, but this option is not made available and the browser's back button is purposely disabled. In addition, the software automatically saves previous searches and makes these available on the main search page, but it does not provide a function for the user to delete these old searches as they begin to clutter up this screen. Finally, when viewing an individual record, a user can also view its subject terms, which are in a hierarchical tree structure, but it is not possible to directly navigate this tree. These examples provide only a brief sample of the usability issues of the software. The weaknesses of the system can be fully enumerated in comparison with a newer software packages that serves a similar function. An example would be the Endeca faceted-browsing system, as implemented for the library catalog of the Triangle Research Libraries Network (TRLN) in North Carolina.

== See also ==
- German Archaeological Institute
