= Sainte-Croix-du-Mont =

- Commune
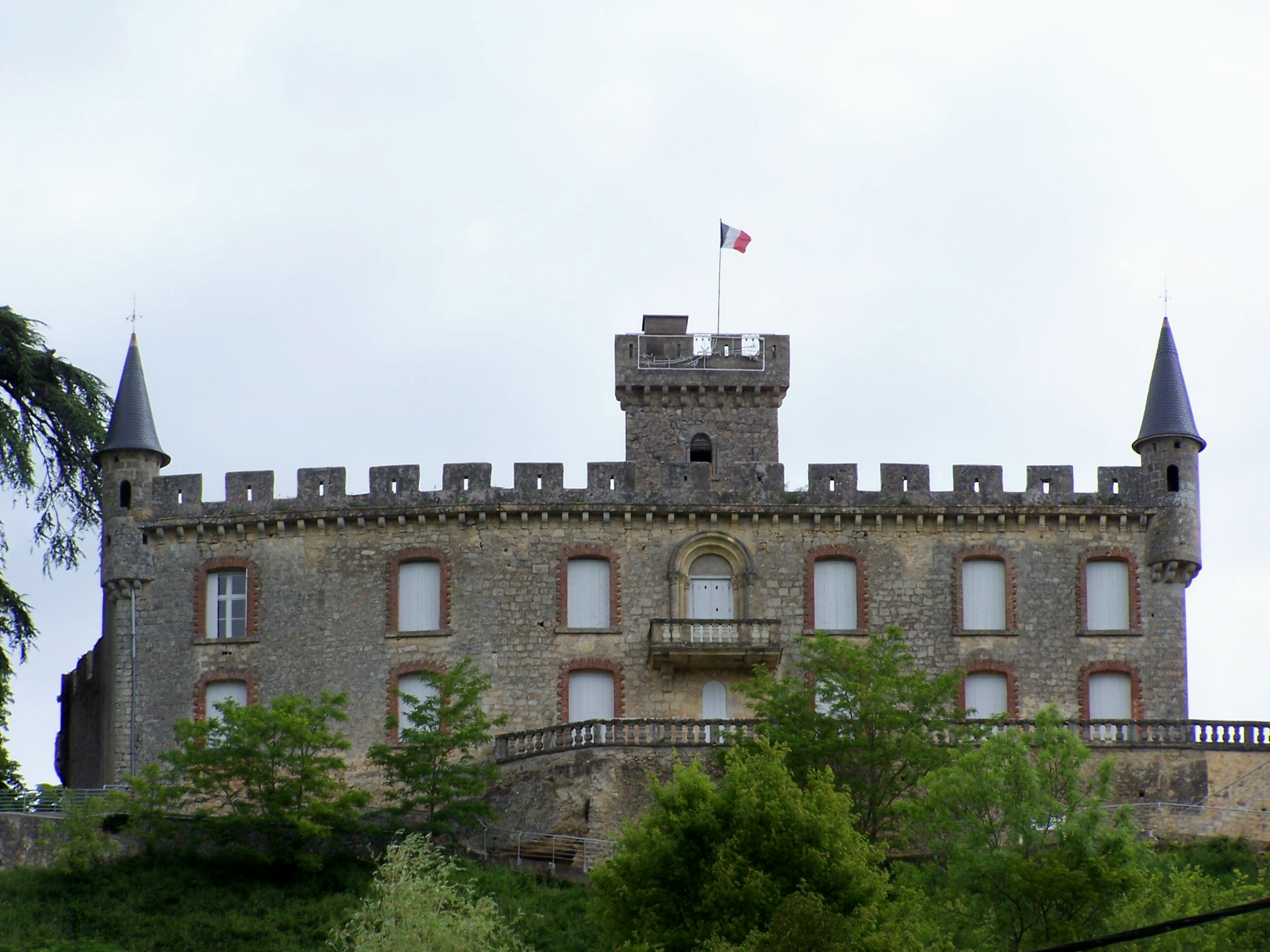
- Chateau, now the town hall
- Location of Sainte-Croix-du-Mont
- Location within France Location within Nouvelle-Aquitaine
- Coordinates: 44°35′39″N 0°16′46″W
- Country: France
- Region: Nouvelle-Aquitaine
- Department: Gironde
- Arrondissement: Langon
- Canton: L'Entre-Deux-Mers

Government
  - Mayor (2020–2026): Michel Latapy
- Area^{1}: 8.98 km^{2} (3.47 sq mi)
- Elevation: 90 m (300 ft)
- Highest elevation: 118 m (387 ft)
- Lowest elevation: 1 m (3.3 ft)
- Population (2023): 838
  - Density: 93.3/km^{2} (242/sq mi)
- Time zone: UTC+01:00 (CET)
  - Summer (DST): UTC+02:00 (CEST)
- INSEE/Postal code: 33392 /33410
- ^{1} French Land Register data, which excludes lakes, ponds, glaciers > 1 km^{2} (0.386 sq mi or 247 acres) and river estuaries.

Sainte-Croix-du-Mont (French pronunciation: [sɛ̃t kʁwa dy mɔ̃]; Gascon: Senta Crotz dau Mont) is a commune in the Gironde department in Nouvelle-Aquitaine in southwestern France.

== Population ==
Historical population
Year	Pop.	±% p.a.
1968	926	—
1975	846	−1.28%
1982	820	−0.44%
1990	804	−0.25%
1999	844	+0.54%
2007	850	+0.09%
2012	899	+1.13%
2017	899	+0.00%
2023	838	−1.16%
Source: INSEE

== See also ==
- Communes of the Gironde department
