= Étienne Laclotte =

Étienne Laclotte (1728–1812) was a French architect, who, alongside his brothers Michel and Jean, designed numerous hôtels particuliers in Bordeaux during the 18th century.

== Selected commissions ==
- Château Labottière, built in partnership with Jean Laclotte, 1770-73 for Étienne Labottière, has been designated a monument historique;
- Hôtel de Lalande, constructed about 1779 in a sober neoclassical idiom. At the present time, the town mansion houses the Museum of Decorative Arts and Design;
- Château Bertranon at Sainte-Croix-du-Mont, Gironde;
- Hôtel Bonnaffé, mansion house built for François Bonnaffé, one of the richest shipowner of Bordeaux.
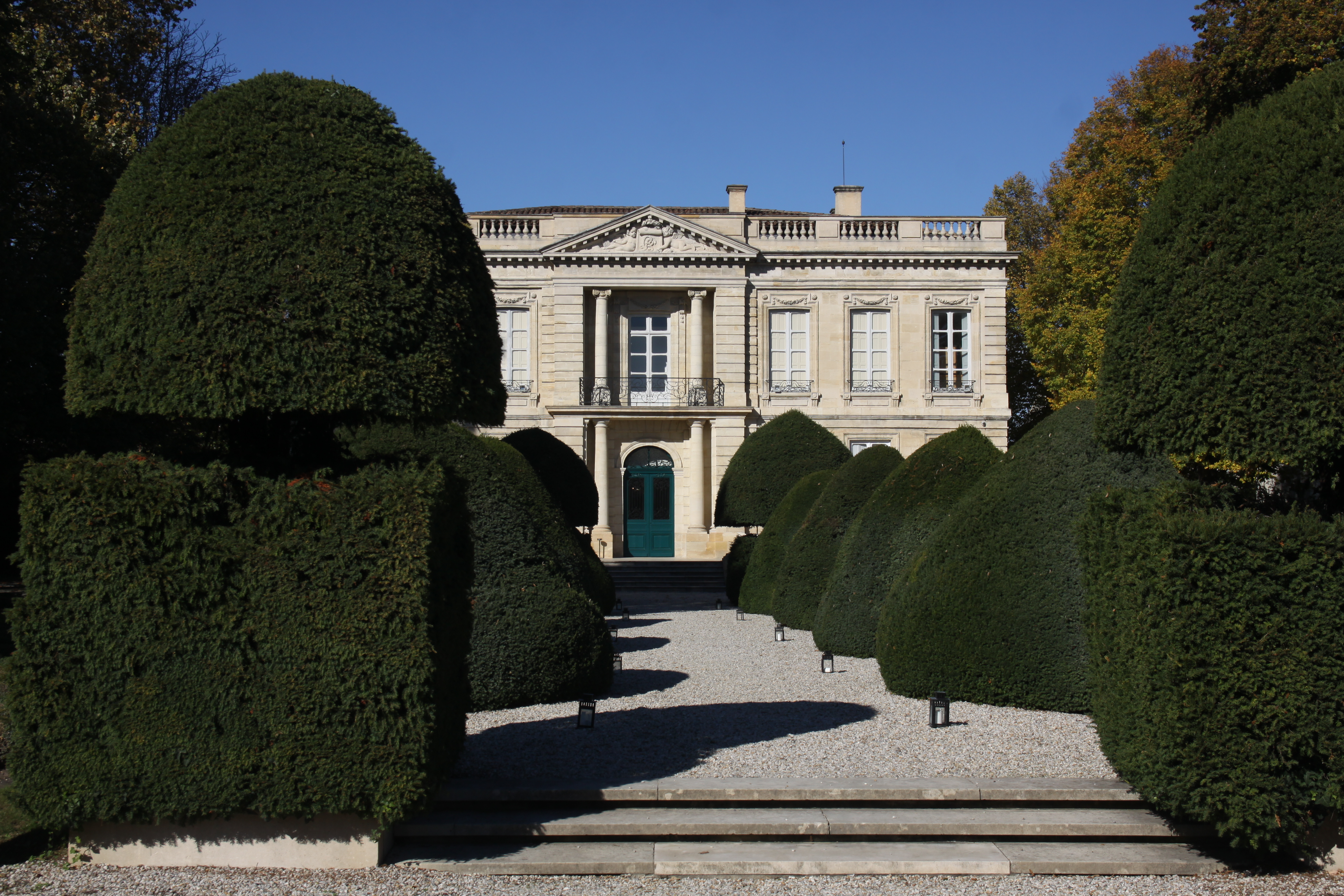
Château Labottière (1773)

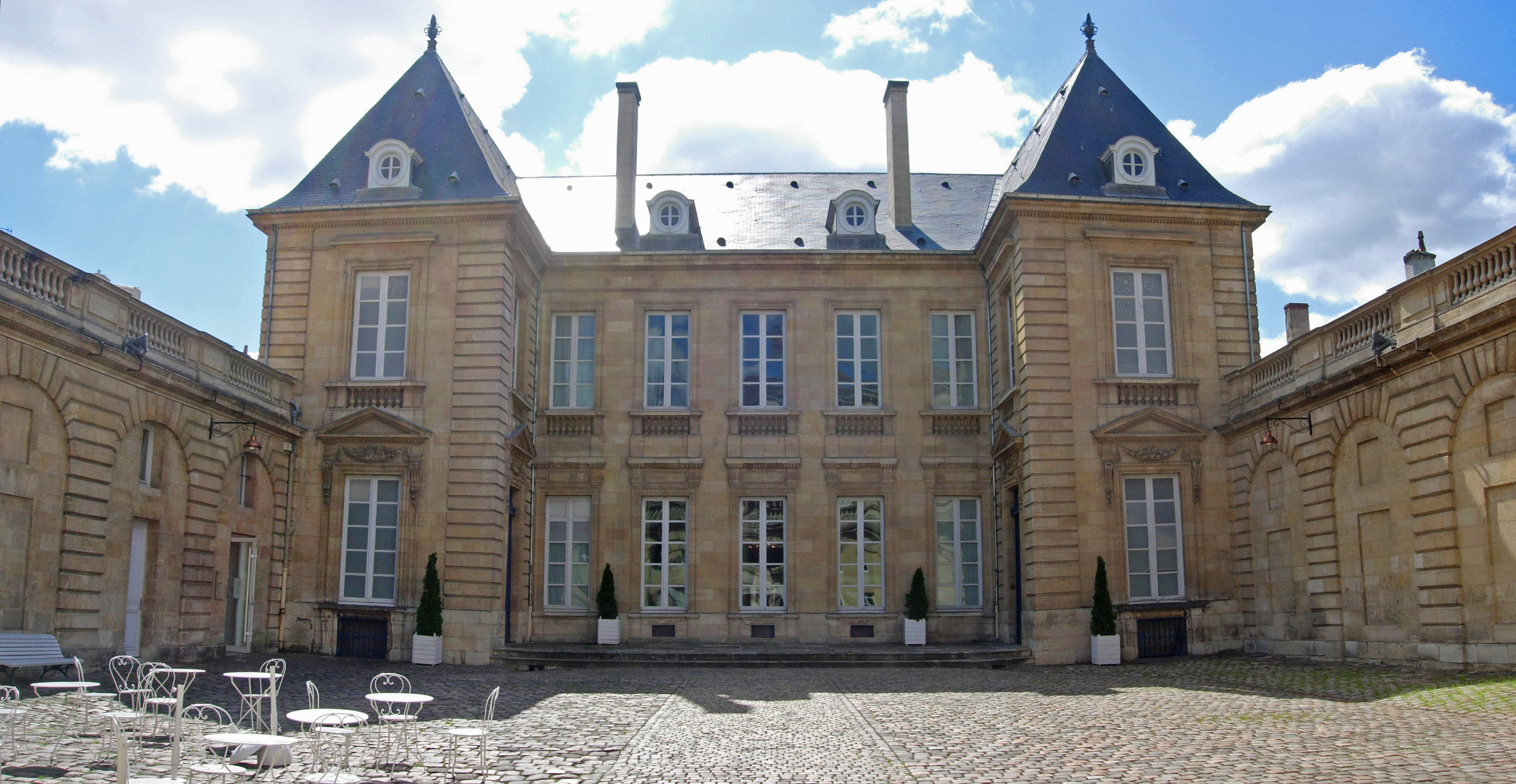
Hôtel de Lalande (1779)

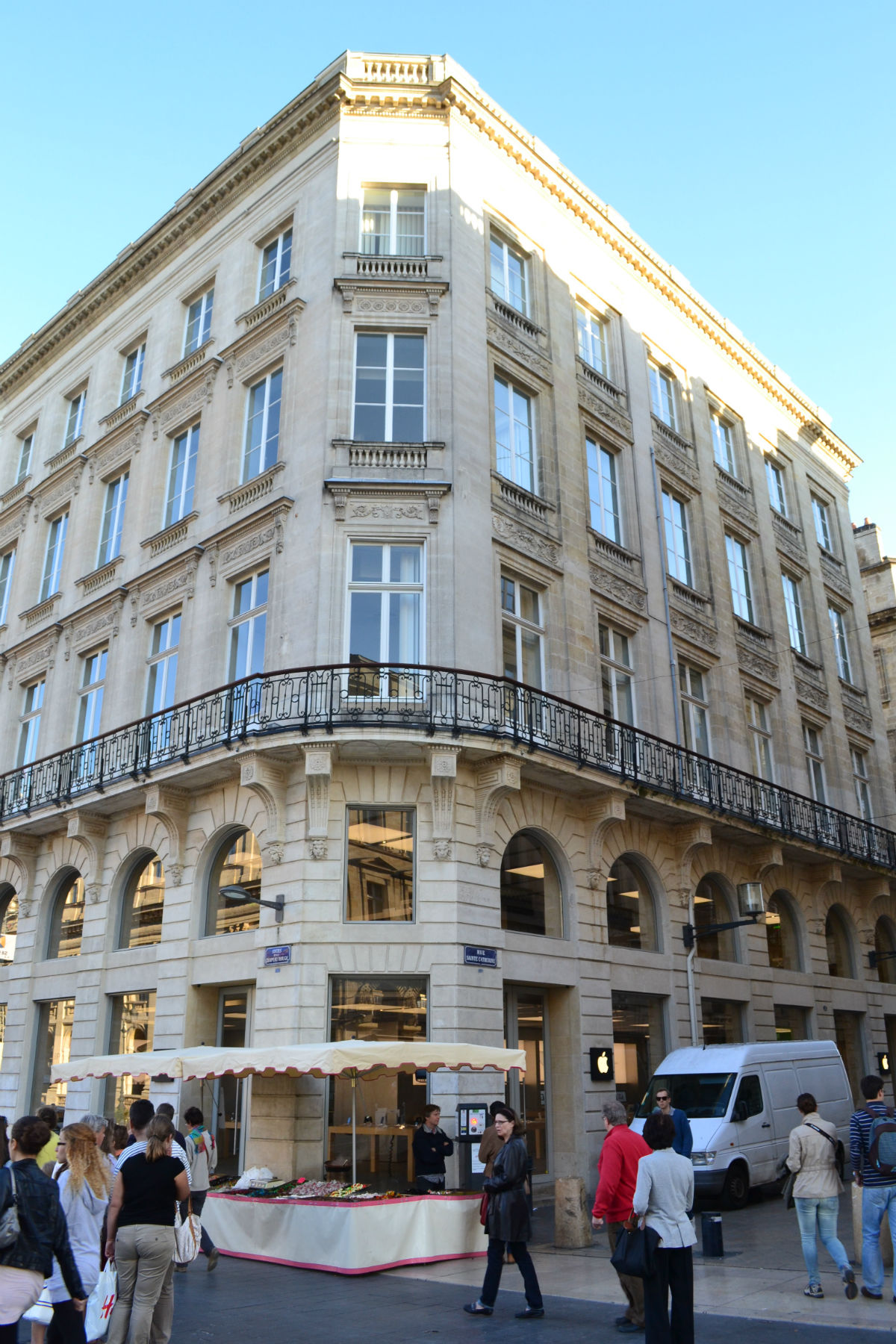
Hôtel Bonnaffé (1785)
