= James Buchanan Duke House =

Historic house in North Carolina, United States

- U.S. National Register of Historic Places
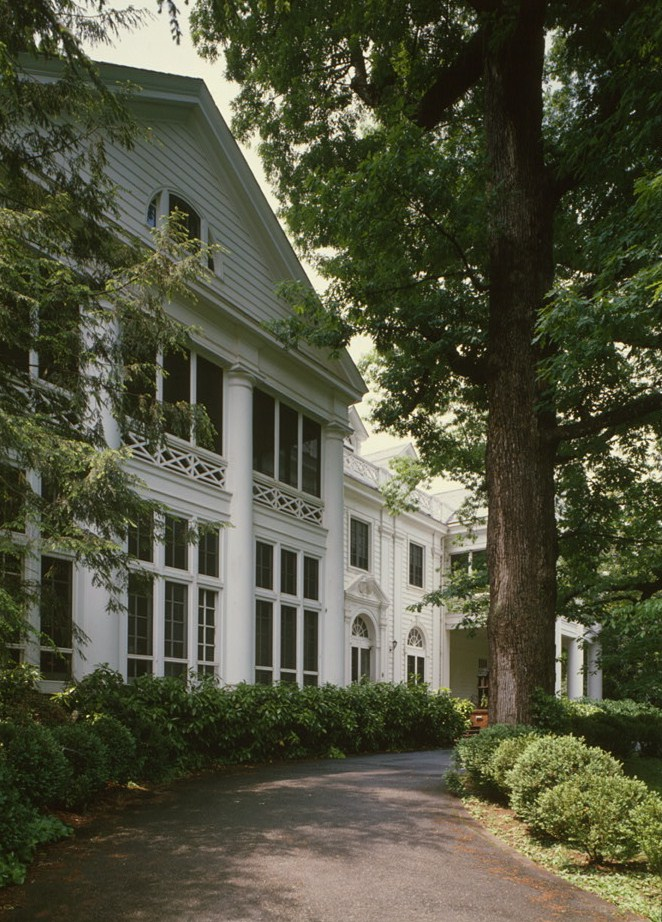
- James Buchanan Duke House, HABS Phot, May 1978

- Location within North Carolina Location within the United States
- Location: 400 Hermitage Rd., near Charlotte, North Carolina
- Coordinates: 35°12′5″N 80°49′39″W
- Area: 4.1 acres (1.7 ha)
- Built: 1914, 1919
- Architect: Hook, Charles C.
- Architectural style: Colonial Revival
- NRHP reference No.: 78001963
- Added to NRHP: January 20, 1978

James Buchanan Duke House, also known as Lynnwood and White Oaks, is a historic home located in Charlotte, Mecklenburg County, North Carolina. It was designed by architect Charles Christian Hook, with the original section built in 1914 and substantially enlarged in 1919. It is an H-shaped Colonial Revival style dwelling consisting of large 2 1/2-story blocks connected by a hyphen of the same height. It features two-story tetrastyle porticos on both the south and north gable ends. It was the home of James Buchanan Duke (1856–1925) during the last five years of his life.

It was listed on the National Register of Historic Places in 1978.
