= New York University Institute of Fine Arts =

School within New York University

Coordinates: 40.7305°N 73.9995°W

Institute of Fine Arts
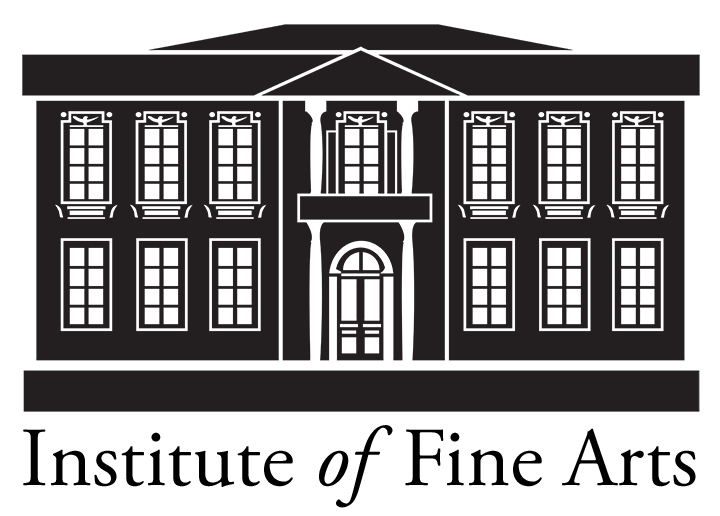
- Type: Private
- Established: 1937
- Parent institution: New York University
- Faculty: 26
- Students: 300
- Location: 1 East 78th Street; New York, New York
- Director: Dr. Joan Kee
- Website: Official website

The Institute of Fine Arts (IFA) is a graduate school and research center of New York University dedicated to the study of the history of art, archaeology, and the conservation and technology of works of art. It offers Master of Arts and Doctor of Philosophy degrees in Art History and Archeology, the Advanced Certificate in Conservation of Works of Art, and the Certificate in Curatorial Studies (issued jointly with the Metropolitan Museum of Art).

Since the school awarded its first PhD in 1933, more than 2000 degrees have been conferred and a high proportion of its alumni hold international leadership roles as professors, curators, museum directors, archaeologists, conservators, critics, and institutional administrators. The IFA's doctoral program was ranked among the best in the United States by the National Research Council’s 2011 study. In June 2024, it was announced that Joan Kee would be the IFA's new director. "Kee specializes in art and the law, comparative diaspora studies, and art and digital communications."

== History ==
The Institute of Fine Arts is housed in the James B. Duke House

Art history became a dedicated field of study at New York University in 1922, when the young scholar-architect Fiske Kimball was appointed the Morse Professor of the Literature of Arts and Design. In 1932, NYU's graduate program in art history moved to the Upper East Side in order to teach in the collections of the Metropolitan Museum of Art. In 1936, the Graduate Department moved to the second floor of the Carlyle Hotel on Madison Avenue.

Under the leadership of its chairman, Walter William Spencer Cook, the program was renamed the Institute of Fine Arts in 1937. The institute was strengthened greatly by refugee professors from the German and Austrian institutions that had given birth to the modern discipline of art history. Foundational art historians such as Erwin Panofsky, Walter Friedlaender, Karl Leo Heinrich Lehmann, Julius Held, and Richard Krautheimer set the institute on its course of rigorous, creative, and pluralistic scholarship and strong worldwide connections.

In 1958, under the leadership of G. Lauder Greenway, the chairman of the advisory committee (and former director), and Craig Smyth, the institute's director, Nanaline Duke and her daughter Doris Duke presented the institute with the James B. Duke House at 1 East 78th Street. By the end of the year, Robert Venturi had completed the remodeling of the house for the institute's use. Also in 1958, the Curatorial Studies program was established. Two years later, the IFA became the first graduate program in the United States to offer an advanced degree in conservation and founded the Conservation Center, which in 1983 moved to the Stephen Chan House Conservation Center across the street from the Duke House.

Louise Bourgeois, who was married to Goldwater during the time when he taught at the IFA, donated all six copies of The Institute (2002, silver) to the IFA in 2005. One of the copies now resides at the IFA's first floor lunch room, also known as "The Marble Room." The sculpture is a silver-plated scale model of Duke House, with removable roof and tiny rooms inside.

== Research ==
The Institute of Fine Arts offers four degree programs. It confers a M.A. and a Ph.D. in the History of Art and Archaeology as well as two certificate programs in Curatorial Studies and the Conservation of Works of Art. The IFA's Ph.D. program is normally six years and requires 18 courses, a qualifying paper, two foreign language certifications, major and minor field examinations, and a dissertation. The M.A. program is two years full-time or three years part-time. It requires 10 courses, one foreign language certification, and a master's thesis. The Advanced Certificate in Conservation is taken jointly with the M.A. program and adds two years of study, including a one-year internship in a conservation lab. The Certificate in Curatorial Studies is taken jointly with the Ph.D. program and it requires a residency at The Metropolitan Museum of Art. IFA students have access to special academic programs such as archaeological excavations, travel grants, global research locations, and IFA-sponsored conferences and symposia.

=== Faculty ===
There are 26 faculty members who teach at the institute and Conservation Center, with areas of study ranging from early Egyptian to modern and contemporary American art. Some of the most notable faculty members that have taught or are currently teaching at the institute include: Harry Bober, Jonathan Brown, Thomas E. Crow, Walter Friedlander, Robert Goldwater, Horst W. Janson, Richard Krautheimer, Linda Nochlin, David O'Connor, Richard Offner, Erwin Panofsky, John Pope-Hennessy, Robert Rosenblum, Patricia Rubin, Meyer Shapiro, Leo Steinberg, Robert Storr and Kirk Varnedoe.

== Conservation Center ==
The Conservation Center of the Institute of Fine Arts, New York University has the oldest graduate degree-granting conservation program in the world. The Conservation Center of the Institute of Fine Arts confers two degrees: a Master's in the History of Art and Archaeology and the Advanced Certificate in the Conservation of Historic and Artistic Works. Students undertake laboratory work, seminars, research projects, and gain intensive experience through fieldwork and their fourth-year Internship.

Conservators usually specialize in a particular material or type of object, such as paintings, sculpture, works of art on paper, books and manuscripts, textiles, architecture, archaeological material, or ethnographic objects, or in a field of study, such as preventive care, art transport, installation and storage, or the history of artists’ materials and methods. Collaboration with related fields, such as conservation science, computer science and digital imaging, museum curatorship, exhibition design, or archival studies, is increasingly critical to the successful practice of conservation and enriches the profession accordingly. Students gain expertise in conservation of cultural artifacts and artworks from a variety of New York City's public and private museums, including The Metropolitan Museum of Art, MoMA, the Whitney Museum, the Guggenheim Museum, the American Museum of Natural History, the Brooklyn Museum of Art, and nearby galleries, private collections, auction houses, historic properties, and private conservation studios.

== Excavations ==
The institute undertakes excavations at Aphrodisias, Turkey; the Sanctuary of the Gods in Samothrace; at Abydos, Egypt; and Selinunte, Italy.

=== Abydos, Egypt ===
In collaboration with Yale University and the University of Pennsylvania, the IFA is engaged in a long-term archeological study of the history of the significant site of Abydos in southern Egypt. Abydos is known as the burial place of Egypt's first kings, and later became the primary cult place of the god Osiris, ruler of the Land of the Dead. The excavations aim to build a comprehensive understanding of the ancient activities at the site, how its operations and meaning evolved over time, and its relation to the broader context of Egyptian history and culture.

=== Samothrace, Greece ===
Since 1938, the IFA has worked in the Sanctuary of the Gods in Samothrace, Greece, uncovering the home of its famous mystery cult with a series of great marble buildings, dedicated by Philip II and his successors, and seminal in the formation of Hellenistic architecture. At this stage, the project's emphasis is on study and preparation of publications, as well as conservation.

=== Selinunte, Italy ===
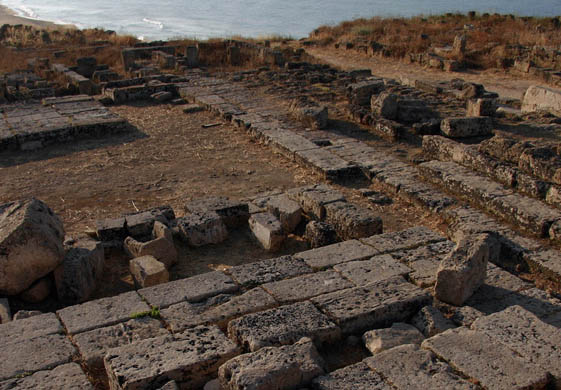
Selinunte, Italy excavation site

Selinunte was famous throughout the Classical world for the richness of its farmland and monumental temples. It enjoyed a prosperous existence from the second half of the seventeenth century BCE through the middle of the third century BCE, and its sanctuaries, temples, fortifications, and houses are well preserved. In 2007, the IFA began its excavation on the Acropolis of Selinunte in western Sicily, focusing on the area of the main urban sanctuary of the ancient Greek colony. The excavations document the social history, as well as the architectural and visual culture of an ancient city in unusually fine detail. Fieldwork to date has already provided important evidence concerning the history of Selinunte prior to the arrival of the Greek colonists, as well as significant finds of pottery and sculpture originally dedicated as votive offerings in the sanctuary area.

=== Aphrodisias, Turkey ===
Aphrodisias is one of the most important archeological sites of the Greek and Roman periods in Turkey. The city was famous in antiquity for its cult of Aphrodite and for its marble sculptures. It enjoyed a long, prosperous existence from the second century BCE through the sixth century CE, and its buildings, marble sculpture, and public inscriptions are remarkably well preserved. The current excavation focuses on the recording and conservation of previously excavated monuments, establishing permanent systems for documentation and conservation, new targeted excavations, and scientific research and publication.

The institute publishes the IFA Archaeology Journal, which documents progress of the excavations as well as the involvement of the IFA faculty and students in international archeological research.

== Contemporary art at the institute ==
The Institute of Fine Arts has been influential in the study of contemporary and modern art historical scholarship. Robert Goldwater’s 1937 dissertation "Primitivism and Modern Art" made an important contribution to the study of primitivism's role in Western art of the early twentieth-century. Later, as a member of the faculty, Goldwater was joined by Robert Rosenblum, who cultivated close relationships with many New York contemporary artists, especially among the Pop generation, and brought this firsthand knowledge to his teaching over more than three decades. During the 1980s Kirk Varnedoe, like Rosenblum, extended an initial training in nineteenth-century art into the contemporary sphere, as he would famously demonstrate after assuming the directorship of painting and sculpture at the Museum of Modern Art. Linda Nochlin is the critic and scholar most identified with the emergence of strong feminist art practices from the early 1970s onwards.

In addition, three major contemporary artists, Ad Reinhardt, George Maciunas, and Philip Pearlstein, have all studied art history at the Institute of Fine Arts.

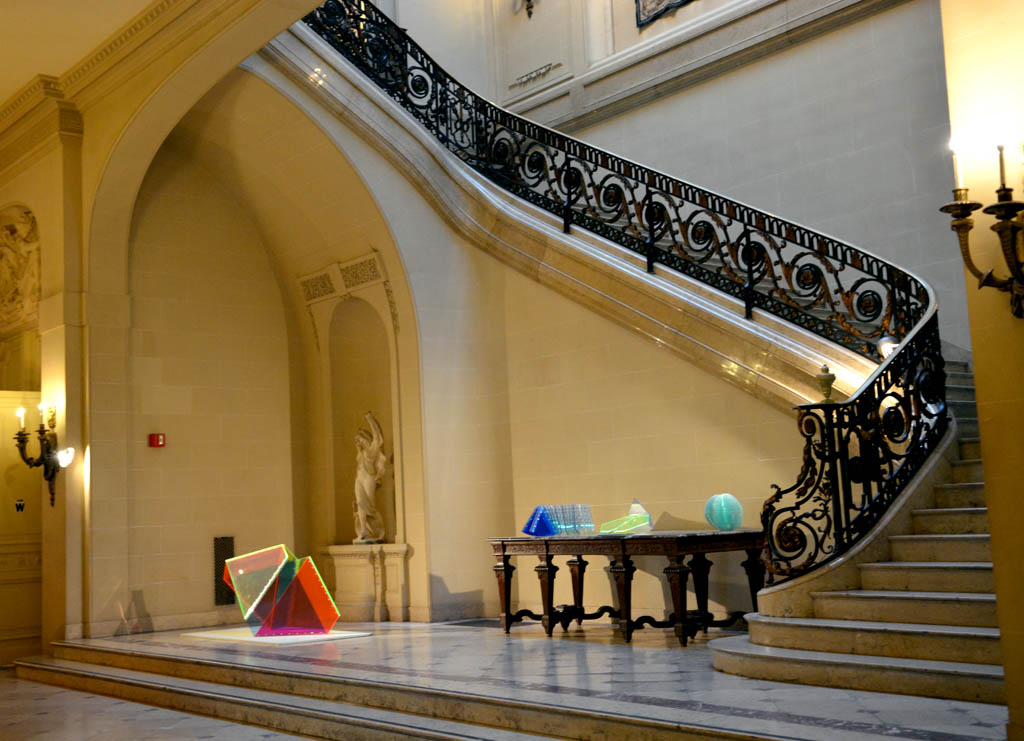
Great Hall Exhibitions Series: Marta Chilindron's work at the Institute of Fine Arts

== Public programming at the institute ==
Each semester, the institute provides an extensive roster of public programming in the fields of art history, archeology, and conservation.

Artists at the institute
Beginning in 1983, the IFA Graduate Students Association has been inviting artists to discuss their work at the institute.
The China Project Workshop
Established in 2011, The China Project Workshop is a discussion forum for work in progress on topics in Chinese archeology and art history.
Walter W.S. Cook Annual Lecture
The Walter W.S. Cook Lecture is organized by the IFA Alumni Association in honor of Professor Cook, Founding director of the IFA and historian of Medieval Spanish Art.
Judith Praska Professorship Public Lecture
This visiting professorship, established by an anonymous donor and named in honor of the donor's grandmother, welcomes a prominent conservator or scientist each semester to the IFA who is advancing new areas for research and teaching in art conservation. The professorship will run for four years through Spring 2016.
Samuel H. Kress Lecture
The Samuel H. Kress Lecture is delivered annually by a prominent scholar in conservation, who presents important issues within the fields of painting conservation and technical art history. This event is made possible through the generosity of the Samuel H. Kress Foundation.
Seminar on Greek and Roman Art and Architecture

The Seminar on Greek and Roman Art and Architecture invites scholars to share their current research with the IFA community on Ancient Art and Archeology.

Latin American Forum Sponsored by the Institute for Studies on Latin American Art
This forum invites distinguished visiting lecturers to the IFA to foster greater understanding and recognition of Latin American art around the world.
Daniel H. Silberberg Lecture Series
Planned and coordinated by the Graduate Student Association, this series of lectures invites art historians, archeologists, and conservators, specializing in a variety of periods and genres to share their latest research with the IFA community and the general public. The 2013–2014 Silberberg Lecture Series addressed the complex role translation plays within the production and interpretation of art — considering how images and objects have been mined and recontextualized across time, space, culture, and medium, as well as exploring the limits of visual communication and literacy in fostering new ways of thinking about appropriation, influence, and audience.
The Annual Kirk Varnedoe Memorial Lectures
The Kirk Varnedoe Memorial Lectures were established in 2006 to honor and perpetuate the memory of Professor Varnedoe's dedicated and innovative teaching, mentoring, and scholarship at the Institute of Fine Arts.
Colloquium on Art in Spain and Latin America
For this series of informal lectures and panels, leading specialists are invited to the institute to explore art historical and broader contextual issues relating to the arts of Spain and Latin America. The series is coordinated by Professors Jonathan Brown, Robert Lubar, and Edward Sullivan.
The IFA-Frick Symposium
For more than half a century, The Frick Collection and the Institute of Fine Arts have hosted a symposium for graduate students in art history. The symposium offers doctoral candidates in art history the opportunity to deliver original research papers in a public forum and to engage with colleagues in the field — novice and expert. This event is preceded by an in-house symposium with presentations by three IFA students, of which one is selected to represent the IFA.
