= Kulturverlag Kadmos =

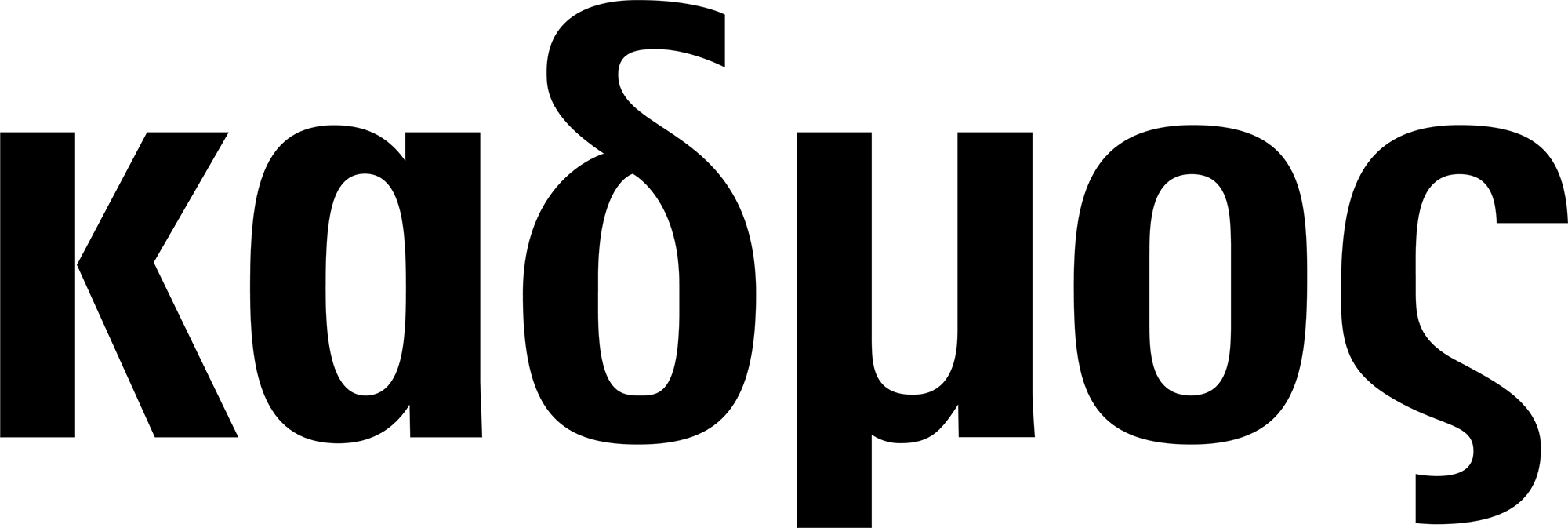
- Genre: Publishing house
- Founded: 4 November 1995
- Founder: Wolfram Burckhardt, Martin Burckhardt
- Headquarters: Berlin, Germany
- Area served: Europe
- Products: books
- Website: www.kulturverlag-kadmos.de

The Kulturverlag Kadmos is a non-fiction and fiction publishing house founded in Berlin in 1995.

== History ==
The publishing house was founded on 4 November 1995 by Wolfram Burckhardt and Martin Burckhardt. The publisher's name refers to Greek Mythology and is named after Kadmos, the son of Phoenicia King Agenor of Tyros: While searching for his sister Europe kidnapped by Zeus, Kadmos brought the Phoenician alphabet to Greece. In this respect, the publishing activity began with a presentation of the origins of the alphabet. In the early years, the focus was on translations, rediscoveries and rediscoveries. The initial programme included Daniel Paul Schreber's Memories of a Nervous Patient, Charles Babbage's Passages from a Philosopher's Life and biographies of Walt Disney and Ada Lovelace. In 2012, the publisher's logo was renewed with a Greek type in the style of the Univers typeface. Publishing director is classical philologist Wolfram Burckhardt.

== Awards ==
- 2019 First Publishing Prize of Germany
- 2016 Gregor Calendar Award

== Publishing program ==
The publishing house has an extensive fiction non-fiction programme with an international focus in the fields of cultural history, art history, media, technical history and science as well as literature, philosophy, history and politics. The publishing spectrum also includes novels such as The Laws of Hospitality by Pierre Klossowski. The special series are the scientific „Kadmos Kaleidogramme" and the Berlin Programme of Media Studies edited by Wolfgang Ernst und Friedrich Kittler. From the Akademie Verlag, Kadmos publishing house has taken over the series Literature Research, which Karlheinz Barck (1934-2012) and Sigrid Weigel (Leibniz Centre for Literary and Cultural Research) have published. The publishing house also offers weekly calendars with picture postcards.

== Authors of the publisher (selection) ==
Werner Abelshauser, Jan Assmann, Armen Avanessian, Charles Babbage, Tilman Baumgärtel, Norbert Bolz, Mercedes Bunz, Martin Burckhardt, Georges Didi-Huberman, Alexander García Düttmann, Shmuel N. Eisenstadt, Thomas Elsaesser, Wolfgang Ernst, Ottmar Ette, Quentin Fiore, Heinz von Foerster, Karl Gutzkow, Marcus Graf, Hans Ulrich Gumbrecht, Anselm Haverkamp, Fredric Jameson, Nicole C. Karafyllis, Friedrich Kittler, Pierre Klossowski, Alexander Kluge, Elmar Lampson, Gustav Landauer, Joseph de Maistre, Helga Nowotny, Nicole Oresme, Claus Pias, Christoph Rehmann-Sutter, Hans-Jörg Rheinberger, Laurence A. Rickels, Richard Schickel, Daniel Paul Schreber, Peter Sloterdijk, Georg Stauth, Friedrich Theodor Vischer, H. Johannes Wallmann, Hartmut Winkler, Sigrid Weigel, Siegfried Zielinski, Slavoj Žižek, Matthias A. K. Zimmermann
