= Abbas Vali =

Political and social theorist

Abbas Vali (born 1949) is a Kurdish Iranian sociologist, political scientist, and political and social theorist. He specialises in modern and contemporary political thought and modern Middle Eastern politics.

== Biography ==
Vali was born in 1949 in Mahabad, Iran. After earning a BA in Political Science from the National University of Iran in 1973, he moved to the UK to continue his graduate studies in modern political and social theory. He obtained an MA in Politics from the University of Keele in 1976, with a thesis on Some Dilemmas of Russian Populism. He then received his PhD in historical sociology from Birkbeck, University of London in 1983, with a dissertation on Land, Labour and Social Relations in Pre-capitalist Iran: A Theoretical History.

After two years of joint postdoctoral research at the University of London with Sami Zubaida on "Religion and the intelligentsia in the 1979 Iranian revolution", Vali lectured on political theory and modern Middle Eastern politics at the University of Wales, Swansea, from 1985 to 2004. He was a visiting professor at the Boğaziçi University in Istanbul from 2004 to 2006.

In 2005, he moved to Erbil in the Kurdistan Region of Iraq, where he helped establish the University of Kurdistan Hewlêr at the request of the Kurdistan Regional Government and served as its rector after it opened in 2006. He left in 2008 due to conflicts with the KRG over the institution's management.

From 2008 to 2017, he held the chair of modern social and political thought in the Department of Sociology at Boğaziçi University in Istanbul. In 2017, the Turkish Council of Higher Education revoked his work permit, apparently over his involvement in the January 2016 Academics for Peace petition to end the government crackdowns on the Kurds in Turkey.

== Selected works ==
=== Books ===
- Pre-Capitalist Iran: A Theoretical History, New York: I.B. Tauris, 1993.
- Essays on the Origins of Kurdish Nationalism, (ed.), Costa Mesa, California: Mazda Publishers, 2003.
- Essays on the Origins of Kurdish Nationalism (ed.), Costa Mesa, CA: Mazda Publishers, 2003.
- Kurds and the State in Iran: The Making of Kurdish Identity, London, I.B. Tauris, 2011.
- [https://doi.org/10.1007/978-3-030-16069-2 The Forgotten Years of Kurdish Nationalism in Iran, Cham: Palgrave Macmillan, 2020.

=== Articles ===
- "The Character of the Organization of Production in Iranian Agriculture, 1891–1925", in Iran: Precapitalism, Capitalism, and Revolution, ed. Georg Stauth, Saarbrücken: Breitenbach, 1980.
- "Factionalism and Political Discourse in the Islamic Republic of Iran: The Case of the Hajiataliyeh Society" (with Sami Zubaida), Economy and Society, 14.2 (1985), pp. 139–173.
