= Anselm Haverkamp =

German philosopher

Anselm Haverkamp (born July 18, 1943) is a German-American professor of literature and philosophy.

== Biography ==
He received his academic education at the University of Freiburg, the University of Zurich, the University of Bonn, and the University of Konstanz. After his PhD at Heidelberg University and his Habilitation in the Konstanz School of Criticism, he moved from Konstanz to Yale University; since 1989, he has taught as professor of English at New York University, where he also founded the Poetics and Theory Program. Since 1994, he has served as founding member of the newly established European University Viadrina in Frankfurt an der Oder, East of Berlin. In 2009, he was made an honorary professor of philosophy at LMU Munich.

== Works ==
Haverkamp was a member and co-editor of the research group Poetik und Hermeneutik in its later phase, 1979-1996. Under the influence of the Yale School of deconstruction (Paul de Man, Jacques Derrida), he developed the Konstanz School's Rezeptionsästhetik (Wolfgang Iser, Hans Robert Jauß, Wolfgang Preisendanz) from a theory of literary response (Reader-response criticism) to a theory of literary latency. Relevant parts of this theory are the theory of metaphor or metaphorology, including the history of rhetoric and historical epistemology, as well as the relationship of philosophy and literature.

Main references of his work include the Poetics of Aristotle, the Rhetoric of Quintilian, the Aesthetics of Alexander Gottlieb Baumgarten, as well as the work of Benjamin and Derrida, Hans Blumenberg and Stanley Cavell. Relevant literary authors include Ovid, Shakespeare and Keats, Hölderlin, Joyce and Beckett.

More recently, Haverkamp has extended the theory of latency into the fields of historical epistemology, art theory and legal studies. He is a regular contributor and editor of Texte zur Kunst (Berlin) und Law and Literature (Berkeley).

== Bibliography ==
Monographs

- Typik und Politik im Annolied. Zum ″Konflikt der Interpretationen″ im Mittelalter. (Diss. Heidelberg 1975) Stuttgart (Metzler) 1979 (medieval allegory) ISBN 3-476-00420-1
- Klopstock/ Milton – Teleskopie der Moderne. Eine Transversale der europäischen Literatur. (Habil. Konstanz 1982) Stuttgart (Metzler) 2018 ISBN 978-3-476-04684-0
- Laub voll Trauer. Hölderlins späte Allegorie. München (Fink) 1991 ISBN 3-7705-2675-9 // Leaves of Mourning: Hölderlin′s Late Work, with an Essay on Keats and Melancholy. Translated by Vernon Chadwick. Albany (SUNY Press) 1996 (late Hölderlin) ISBN 978-0-7914-2740-8 // Le pauvre Holterling. Paris (Herman) 2019
- Hamlet, Hypothek der Macht. Berlin (Kadmos) 2001, 2nd ed. 2004 (Shakespeare and Philosophy) ISBN 3-931659-30-5
- Figura cryptica. Theorie der literarischen Latenz. Frankfurt am Main (Suhrkamp) 2002 (Theory of Latency) ISBN 3-518-29174-2
- Latenzzeit. Wissen im Nachkrieg. Berlin (Kadmos) 2004 (Post-War Theory) ISBN 3-931659-61-5
- Metapher. Die Ästhetik in der Rhetorik. München (Fink) 2007 (Rhetoric and Aesthetics) ISBN 3-7705-3751-3
- Diesseits der Oder. Frankfurter Vorlesungen. Berlin (Kadmos) 2008 (Frankfurt Lectures) ISBN 978-3-86599-055-6
- Begreifen im Bild. Methodische Annäherungen an die Aktualität der Kunst. Berlin (August) 2009 (Historical Epistemology) ISBN 978-3-941360-02-0
- Shakespearean Genealogies of Power. A Whispering of Nothing in ″Hamlet″, ″Richard II″, ″Julius Caesar″, ″Macbeth″, ″The Merchant of Venice″, and ″The Winter′s Tale″. London, New York (Routledge) 2011 (Political Theology) ISBN 978-0-415-59344-1
- Die Zweideutigkeit der Kunst. Zur historischen Epistemologie der Bilder. Berlin (August) 2012 (Ambiguity of Art) ISBN 978-3-941360-23-5
- Commentary: Hans Blumenberg, Paradigmen zu einer Metaphorologie. Frankfurt am Main (Suhrkamp) 2013 ISBN 978-3-518-27010-3
- Baumgarten-Studien. Zur Genealogie der Ästhetik. With Rüdiger Campe and Christoph Menke. Berlin (August) 2014 ISBN 978-3-941360-38-9
- Marginales zur Metapher. Poetik nach Aristoteles. Berlin (Kadmos) 2015 ISBN 978-3-86599-255-0
- Productive Digression. Theorizing Practice. Boston MA (De Gruyter) 2016 ISBN 978-3110482584
- Philosophie de la métaphore. With Jean-Claude Monod. Paris (Herman) 2017 ISBN 978-2-7056-9345-9
- Metapher – Mythos – Halbzeug. Metaphorologie nach Blumenberg. Berlin (De Gruyter) 2018 ISBN 978-3-11-048371-0
- Latenz. Zur Genese des Ästhetischen. Berlin (August) 2019

Edited

- Theorie der Metapher. Darmstadt (Wissenschaftliche Buchgesellschaft) 1983 (new edition 1996) ISBN 3-534-07832-2
- Individualität. Ed. with Manfred Frank. München (Fink) 1988 (Poetik und Hermeneutik, vol. XIII) ISBN 3-7705-2473-X
- Gedächtniskunst. Raum – Bild – Schrift. Studien zur Mnemotechnik. Ed. with Renate Lachmann. Frankfurt am Main (Suhrkamp) 1991 ISBN 3-518-11653-3
- Memoria: Vergessen und Erinnern. Ed. with Renate Lachmann. München (Fink) 1993 (Poetik und Hermeneutik, vol. XV) ISBN 3-7705-2736-4
- Gewalt und Gerechtigkeit. Derrida – Benjamin. Frankfurt am Main (Suhrkamp) 1994 ISBN 3-518-11706-8
- Stimme, Figur. Festschrift für Geoffrey Hartman. Ed. with Aleida Assmann. Stuttgart (Metzler) 1994 (Issue of Deutsche Vierteljahrsschrift)
- Deconstruction Is/In America. A New Sense of the Political. New York NY (NYU Press) 1995 ISBN 9780814773161
- Memory Inc. Return of Repressed Architectural Memory. New York (Anycorp) 1996 (Issue of ANY = Architecture New York, vol. 15)
- Die Sprache der Anderen. Übersetzungspolitik zwischen den Kulturen. Frankfurt am Main (Fischer) 1997 ISBN 3-596-12783-1
- Die paradoxe Metapher. Frankfurt am Main (Suhrkamp) 1998 ISBN 3-518-11940-0
- Hans Blumenberg, Ästhetische und metaphorologische Schriften. Frankfurt am Main (Suhrkamp) 2001 ISBN 3-931659-61-5
- Form und Geschichte. Festschrift für Wolfgang Preisendanz. Ed. with Hermann Kinder. Stuttgart (Metzler) 2002 (Issue of Deutsche Vierteljahrsschrift)
- Walter Benjamin after the 20th Century. The Future of a Past. New York (Cardozo Law School) 2004 (Issue of Cardozo Law Review)
- Derrida/America. The Present State of America′s Europe. Ed. with Peter Goodrich. New York (Cardozo Law School) 2005 (Issue of Cardozo Law Review)
- Das Bild ist der König. Repräsentation nach Louis Marin. Ed. with Vera Beyer and Jutta Voorhoeve. München (Fink) 2006 ISBN 978-3-7705-4040-2
- Hans Blumenberg, Theorie der Unbegrifflichkeit. Frankfurt am Main (Suhrkamp) 2007 ISBN 3-931659-61-5
- Metaphorologie. Zur Praxis von Theorie. Ed. with Dirk Mende. Frankfurt am Main (Suhrkamp) 2009 ISBN 978-3-518-29528-1

Festschriften for Anselm Haverkamp

- Literatur als Philosophie – Philosophie als Literatur. Ed. Eva Horn, Bettine Menke and Christoph Menke. München (Fink) 2006 ISBN 978-3-7705-4099-0
- Latenz. 40 Annäherungen an einen Begriff. Ed. Stephanie Dieckmann and Thomas Khurana. Berlin (Kulturverlag Kadmos) 2007 ISBN 978-3-86599-039-6
- Denkfiguren. Für Anselm Haverkamp / Figures of Thought. For Anselm Haverkamp. Ed. Eva Horn and Michèle Lowrie. Berlin (August) 2013 ISBN 978-3-941360-32-7

== See also ==
- List of deconstructionists
