= Matthias Zimmermann =

Matthias Zimmermann is the name of:

- Matthias Zimmermann (footballer, born 1970), German football player, retired
- Matthias Zimmermann (footballer, born 1992), German football player for Fortuna Düsseldorf
- Matthias Zimmermann (artist) (born 1981), media artist from Switzerland
