= Stauth =

Stauth is a surname. Notable people with the surname include:

- Cameron Stauth (born 1948), American author and journalist
- Georg Stauth (born 1942), German sociologist
