= Düttmann =

Düttmann is a German surname. Notable people with the surname include:

- Alexander García Düttmann (born 1961), Spanish-German philosopher
- Peter Düttmann (1923−2001), German fighter pilot
