= Ludus (ancient Rome) =

Latin word for games and primary or gladiator schools

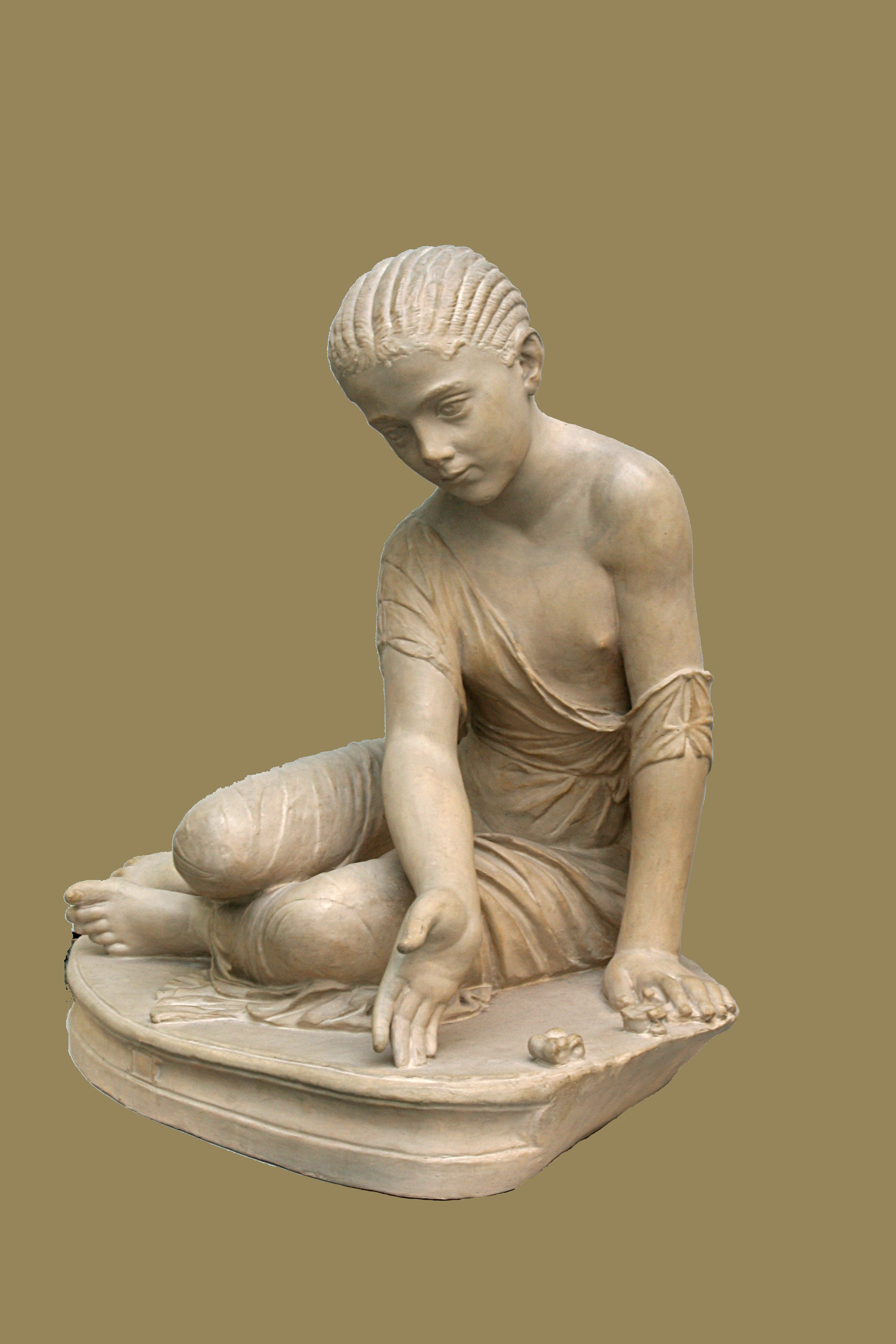
Roman girl at play (ludus) with knucklebones

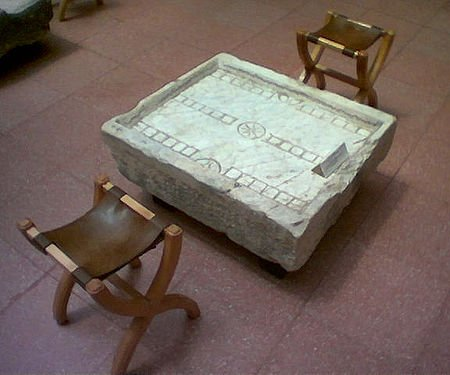
Gaming table for ludus duodecim scriptorum

Ludus (plural ludi) in ancient Rome could refer to a primary school, a board game, or a gladiator training school. The various meanings of the Latin word are all within the semantic field of "play, game, sport, training" (see also ludic).

An elementary or primary school or the school of the "litterator" attended by boys and girls up to the age of 11 was a ludus. Ludi were to be found throughout the city, and were run by a ludi magister (schoolmaster) who was often an educated slave or freedman. School started around six o'clock each morning and finished just after midday. Students were taught math, reading, writing, poetry, geometry and sometimes rhetoric.

The word ludus also referred to a training school for gladiators; see Gladiator § Schools and training. Examples include the Ludus Magnus and Ludus Dacicus.

Ludus was also the word for a board game, examples of which include ludus latrunculorum and ludus duodecim scriptorum, or a game played with knucklebones (astragali).

Latin poetry often explores the concept of ludus as playfulness, both in the writing of poetry as a kind of play and as a field for erotic role-playing. "Poetic play (ludus, ludere, iocum, etc.)," Michèle Lowrie observes, "denotes two related things: stylistic elegance of the Alexandrian variety and erotic poetry."

Ludi, always plural, were the games held in conjunction with Roman religious festivals.

== See also ==
- Lusus Troiae, the Troy Game
- Homo Ludens, Johan Huizinga book on the importance of play in culture and society
