= Friedrich Kittler =

Literary scholar and media theorist

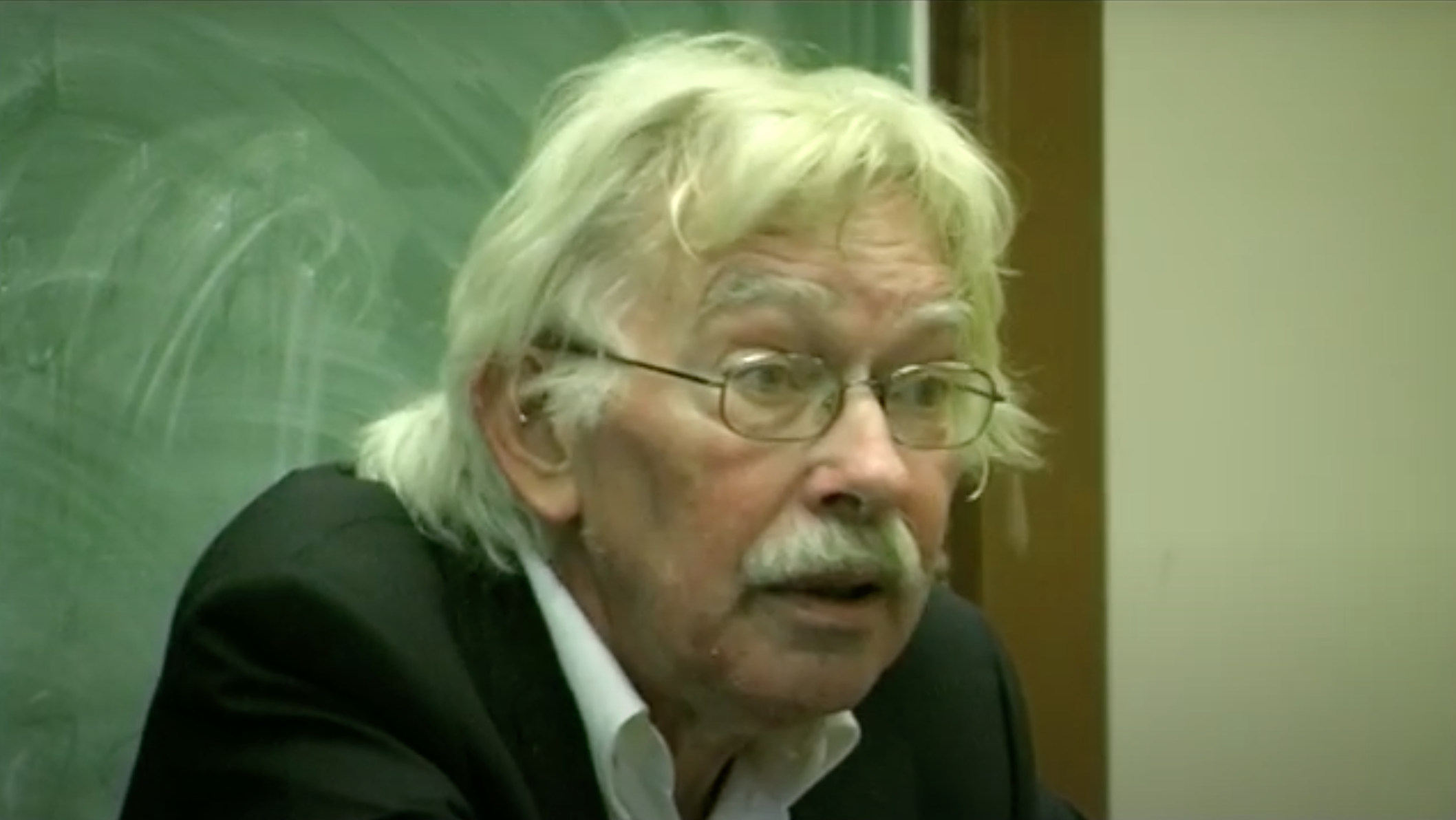
- Born: June 12, 1943; Rochlitz, Nazi Germany
- Died: October 18, 2011 (aged 68); Berlin
- Spouse: Susanne Holl
- Parent: Gustav Adolf Kittler

Academic background
- Education: University of Freiburg
- Thesis: Der Traum und die Rede. Eine Analyse der Kommunikationssituation Conrad Ferdinand Meyers. (1977)
- Influences: Jacques Lacan, Michel Foucault, Claude Shannon, Alan Turing, Norbert Wiener, Pink Floyd, Thomas Pynchon, Marshall McLuhan, Martin Heidegger

Academic work
- Discipline: literary studies, media theory
- Influenced: Bernhard Siegert, Bernhard Dotzler, Cornelia Vismann, Markus Krajewski

Friedrich Adolf Kittler (June 12, 1943 – October 18, 2011) was a literary scholar and a media theorist. His works relate to media, technology, and the military.

== Biography ==
Friedrich Adolf Kittler was born in 1943 in Rochlitz in Saxony, named after his uncle Friedrich and father Adolf. His family fled with him to West Germany in 1958, where from 1958 to 1963 he went to a natural sciences and modern languages Gymnasium in Lahr in the Black Forest, and thereafter, until 1972, he studied German studies, Romance philology and philosophy at the Albert Ludwigs University of Freiburg in Freiburg im Breisgau.

In 1976, Kittler received his doctorate in philosophy after a thesis on the poet Conrad Ferdinand Meyer. In 1976 he co-edited with Horst Turk an essay collection, Urszenen. Between 1976 and 1986 he worked as academic assistant at the university's Deutsches Seminar. In 1984, he earned his Habilitation at the University of Freiburg, in the field of Modern German Literary History, by the habilitationsschrift Aufschreibesysteme 1800/1900 [translated as Discourse Networks 1800/1900]. Typical habilitations required 3 academic evaluations, but his required 13. Some objected that it "misses in principle the scholarly discourse".

Friedrich Kittler became an Assistant Professor in German at Freiburg for the next decade. He had several stints as a visiting assistant professor or visiting professor at universities around the world, such as the University of California, Berkeley (1982), the University of California, Santa Barbara (1982–83), Stanford University (1982–83), University of Basel (1986), and the European Graduate School. He was an associate member of the Collège international de philosophie (1983–86).

From 1986 to 1990, he headed the DFG's Literature and Media Analysis project in Kassel and in 1987 he was appointed Professor of Modern German Studies at the Ruhr University. In 1993 he was appointed to the chair for Media Aesthetics and History at the Humboldt University of Berlin.

In 1993, Kittler was awarded the "Siemens Media Arts Prize" (Siemens-Medienkunstpreis) by ZKM Karlsruhe (Zentrum für Kunst und Medientechnologie, or "Centre for Art and Media Technology") for his research in the field of media theory.

He was recognized in 1996 as a distinguished scholar at Yale University and in 1997 as a distinguished visiting professor at Columbia University in New York. Kittler was a member of the Hermann von Helmholtz Centre for Culture and the research group Bild Schrift Zahl ("Picture Writing Number") (DFG). During the late years in Humbolt, he had an entourage of artists and intellectuals, who self-styled as the Kittlerjugend as a provocative joke on the Hitlerjugend. He died in 2011.

== Philosophy ==
=== Style ===
Among Kittler's theses was his tendency to argue, with a mixture of polemicism, apocalypticism, erudition, and humor, that technological conditions were closely bound up with epistemology and ontology itself. This claim and his style of argumention is aptly summed up in his dictum "Nur was schaltbar ist, ist überhaupt"—a phrase that could be translated as "Only that which is switchable, exists" or more freely, "Only that which can be switched, can be." This phrase plays on the concept that in principle any representation can be presented according to the on/off binary logic of computing. Kittler goes one step further by suggesting that, conversely, anything that can't be "switched" can't really "be," at least under current technical conditions. He invoked this doctrine on his deathbed in 2011. Dying in a hospital in Berlin and sustained only by medical instruments, his final words were "Alle Apparate ausschalten", which translates as "switch off all apparatuses".

=== History of media and science ===
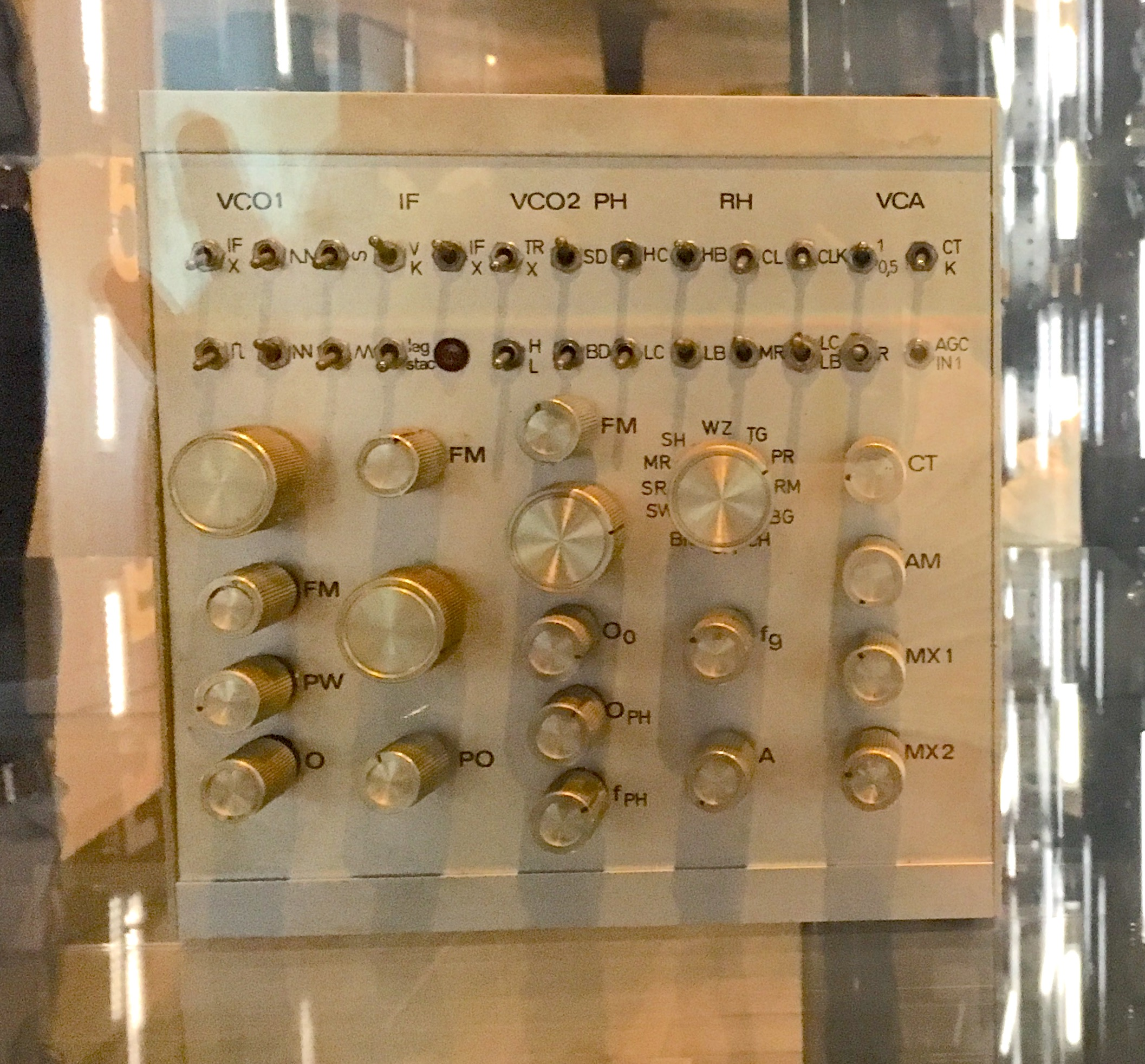
Music synthesizer built by Kittler.

One particular focus of Kittler's work is the close relationship between media, technology, military, and science.

Kittler regularly held seminars [Oberseminar] on History of Media and Science [Medien- und Wissenschaftsgeschichte], on topics ranged from the genealogy of the popes, to Norbert von Hellingrath and Erich von Hornbostel's duties in the First World War.

In Optical Media (based on a lecture series he gave at Humboldt University in 1999), he traced the history of optical media, from Renaissance linear perspective to modern computer graphics.

Since 2000, he wrote on the genealogy between music and mathematics. He expected to write 8 books on this, starting from ancient Greek and ending with Turing machines, but only 2 were finished before his death. In those, he analyzed ancient Greek text fragments and the ancient Greek alphabet as the first vowel alphabet in history. He aimed to provide a foundation to European culture based on ancient Greek, regarding his previous works, which described "man" as a cybernetic data processing system, as correct but too bleak.

=== Politics ===
In political tendencies, Kittler was a conservative who distrusted both sides of the Cold War, and wished that Germany went by a third way. He was against leftist politics, and during the 1968 protests, stayed at home listening to The Beatles and Pink Floyd out of "50% laziness and 50% conservatism". Unlike typical media theorists, his work was not for the typical agendas for exposing media manipulation and liberating human beings, but demonstrating its impossibility, since "media determine our situation". (pp. 5–6)

He was against the profit motive, and consistently criticized the American software industry as a sham, because software does not exist. A software is actually a one-way cryptographic function used to obfuscate the hardware from users, and in this way, restrict the user's freedom. Similarly, protected mode in MS-DOS was denounced as authoritarianism. He also disliked the American military–industrial complex as "the devil".

In his later years, he attempted to found European culture upon ancient Greek, music, and love thus his last books titled Musik und Mathematik: Aphrodite and Eros. During the Iraq war, he stated "we in Germany should not say a word about America’s war on Iraq ... we should talk about love in Europe".

=== War ===
Kittler was deeply concerned with the philosophy of war. He considered war as "mother of all high-speed technologies" and a means of technological transfer. He was impressed during childhood by the material legacy of the V2 rocket and other aspects of the war industry of Nazi Germany. Information about these were unavailable, as discussions were forbidden in East Germany. However, he concerned mostly with three wars from the perspective of Germany: Befreiungskriege, WWI, WWII.

He had a deep interest in interpreting Gravity's Rainbow, and Thomas Pynchon was his favorite contemporary author.

To deepen Foucault's analysis of discourse, Kittler traced discourse to the media technologies that generate discourse, and traced media technologies to war. War is reinterpreted as the struggle for survival between media technologies, which drives their evolution. In particular, he considered WWII not as the triumph of one human ideology over another, but as a developmental stage towards the next stage, where human-made history comes to an end, and history would be made by machines instead. In support, he pointed to the development of computers during WWII. (introduction, p. 243)

=== Literature analysis ===
Kittler analyzed literature as forms of media. The content of literature is interpreted as about media itself. The method of literature analysis was named the Aufschreibesystem [system for writing down], a name he took from Daniel Paul Schreber's Memoirs of My Nervous Illness. As Schreber described it, every thought he had was instantly written down by God, because God could not see what is inside humans, and resorts to recording surface effects. Despite this, God would eventually collect all surface effects of Schreber, and see him just as well. Kittler uses this word to mean that literature analysis would be taken on the material level, where instead of reading a book, it is manipulated as a codex of inked papers.

For example, in Dracula's Legacy, he analyzed Dracula (1897) as a drama of media, where the vampire is tracked down by Mina Harker's careful typewriting and collating of information about Dracula. It is "a written account of our bureaucratization".

Goethe's Faust (1808) was analyzed in Discourse Networks as a record of how the "republic of scholars" was becoming subsumed by a printed media culture. Faust's laments about scholarship was a metaphor for the previous republic of scholars that degenerated into endless commentary, "which simply heaves words around". Faust's rejection was a metaphor for Romanticism, which elevates original genius from true feelings inside each individual. In the Romanticism discourse network, text is used as sound, and reading is controlled auditory hallucination, thus the focus on poetry. Speech was learned from mothers, thus text was from "Mother's Mouth", and the concept of women was merged with the concept of Nature, which is the source of meaning.

During 1900s, new media technologies gave rise to new discourse networks. Psychophysics studies the human body and its speech, writing, etc, as physical activities. Psychoanalysis decomposed the human psyche into modules and forces. Modernism rose in opposition to Romanticism, where the bare syllables and sound are foregrounded, while meaningless compositions are not shunned, but experimented with.

=== Media theory ===
Kittler applied the Shannon–Weaver model for an analysis of digital media that does not refer to meaning and persons, thus bypassing hermeneutics.

Friedrich Kittler is influential in the new approach to media theory that grew popular starting in the 1980s, new media (German: technische Medien, which translates roughly to "technical media"). Kittler's central project is to "prove to the human sciences [...] their technological-media a priori" (Hartmut Winkler), or in his own words: "Driving the human out of the humanities". This is the title of a collection of lectures that he edited.

By adopting the French post-structuralists' theory, he was working in opposition to hermeneutics and phenomenology then-prevalent in German humanities. As a research program against hermeneutic interpretation of text, he used Lacan and Foucault to bypass questions of subjectivity and self-reflection. Hermeneutic interpretation reads through text to discover timeless concepts revolving "man", "author", "origin", "inwardness", concepts that Kittler wished to demonstrate are not timeless after all, but depends on particular technologies. He offered a genealogical critique of hermeneutics, that, instead of being about eternal truths, would become just a way of using text depending on 1800s technology, and would become obsolete. (foreword to)

Technologies are not analyzed as socially produced, or subjectively meaningful. They are instead treated as the source of society and meaning.

To begin with, one should attempt to abandon the usual practice of conceiving of power as a function of so-called society, and, conversely, attempt to construct sociology from the chip’s architectures. Literature, media, information systems, p. 162

Kittler's theory of discourse network [Aufschreibesysteme, literally "system for writing down"] is based on Foucault's analysis of discourse. According to Kittler, a discourse network is the collection of "technologies and institutions that allow a given culture to select, store, and process relevant data". During 1800s Europe, universal literacy and a single alphabetical writing system led to the illusion of authors, such as Goethe. Individual humans became authors, the illusionary origins of meaning. During 1900s Europe, new media disrupted the previous discourse network, which disrupted the idea of authors, and of humans (a biological concept) as persons (a psychological concept).

In Gramophone, film, typewriter, he traced the evolution of early 20th century media technology, and "collects, comments upon, and relays passages and texts that show ... the novelty of technological media". (page xi) He described methods to apply literary criticism to laboratories, factories, mathematics, circuit boards, or any other information systems.

He applied Lacan's psychoanalysis theory. The Symbolic, with its logic of structure and differentiation, corresponds to text. The Imaginary, sustaining the illusion of a unified, coherent subject, corresponds to film that creates illusionary continuity from still images. The Real corresponds to the phonograph, which stored not only words but also the raw, unfiltered noise that cannot be incorporated into any symbolic system.

In Kittler's schema, there was a three-step evolution in communication. With the development of alphabetical writing, communication is separated from the person, since people may communicate over long distances without being there in person. With the development of digital communication machines such as telegraphs and computers, information is separated from communication, since the networks exchange much more information than can be humanly understood, and indeed, most of what is exchanged over the networks, such as diagnostic metadata, is not meant for human consumption. The difference between information and communication is that while communication presumes human meaning and intent, information (in Shannon's theory) is defined by statistical correlation without assuming anything about humans.

Digital information, unlike analog information such as the phonograph and the film, is unified by discrete numbers. A file on a computer is not inherently sound or image, but only interpreted as such on the surface. Kittler predicts that this will give rise to a new unified discourse network, much like the discourse network in the 1800s was unified by text.

Kittler sees an autonomy in technology and therefore disagrees with Marshall McLuhan's Understanding Media: The Extensions of Man: "Media are not pseudopods for extending the human body. They follow the logic of escalation that leaves us and written history behind it." For example, the Internet was built for the digital machines to exchange information, and human users simply adapted to the machines. He hoped that the Church–Turing thesis is false, since otherwise human history would soon come to an end.

Consequently, he sees in writing literature, in writing programmes and in burning structures into silicon chips a complete continuum: "As we know and simply do not say, no human being writes anymore. [...] Today, human writing runs through inscriptions burnt into silicon by electronic lithography [...]. The last historic act of writing may thus have been in the late seventies when a team of Intel engineers [plotted] the hardware architecture of their first integrated microprocessor."

=== Computer programming ===
Kittler believed that, just as the effect of writing had great effect on politics and humanities, digital technology does the same. Therefore, computer literacy is essential for modern intellectuals. He got his first PC in 1989 as a 386.

Kittler taught seminar courses on computer programming, such as Graphic programming in C (1994). He was long interested in the intellectual pre-history of two approaches to computer graphics: raytracing and radiosity. He considered raytracing to be based on Euclidean geometry and differential calculus, while radiosity to thermodynamics.

He wrote programs mainly in C and assembly. He enjoyed debugging and optimizing cycle time by handcrafting the assembly code. The seminars were taught for C programming on UNIX workstations, and the recommended textbook was The C Programming Language (1978). Participants wrote and demonstrated particular algorithms. Examples included a maze-solving algorithm based on Shannon's Thesius robot mouse, a Markov chain text generator (worked particularly well at imitating Heidegger), and a digital card index system inspired by Niklas Luhmann's Zettelkasten.

In summer of 1998 he worked on a radiosity CG program, which he then sent to the authors of a CG textbook and got an excited reply a decade later.

== Bibliography ==
=== Text ===
- 1977: Der Traum und die Rede. Eine Analyse der Kommunikationssituation Conrad Ferdinand Meyers. Bern-Munich
- 1979: Dichtung als Sozialisationsspiel. Studien zu Goethe und Gottfried Keller (with Gerhard Kaiser). Göttingen
- 1985: Aufschreibesysteme 1800/1900. Fink: Munich. ISBN 3-7705-2881-6 (English edition: Discourse Networks 1800 / 1900, with a foreword by David E. Wellbery. Stanford 1990)
- 1986: Grammophon Film Typewriter. Berlin: Brinkmann & Bose. ISBN 3-922660-17-7 (English edition: Gramophone, Film, Typewriter, Stanford 1999)
- 1990: Die Nacht der Substanz. Bern
- 1991: Dichter – Mutter – Kind. Munich
- 1993: Draculas Vermächtnis: Technische Schriften. Leipzig: Reclam. ISBN 3-379-01476-1 Essays zu den "Effekten der Sprengung des Schriftmonopols", zu den Analogmedien Schallplatte, Film und Radio sowie "technische Schriften, die numerisch oder algebraisch verfasst sind".
- 1997: Literature, Media, Information Systems: Essays (published by John Johnston). Amsterdam
- 1998: Hardware das unbekannte Wesen
- 1998: Zur Theoriegeschichte von Information Warfare
- 1999: Hebbels Einbildungskraft – die dunkle Natur. Frankfurt, New York, Vienna
- 2000: Eine Kulturgeschichte der Kulturwissenschaft. München
- 2000: Nietzsche – Politik des Eigennamens: wie man abschafft, wovon man spricht (with Jacques Derrida). Berlin.
- 2001: Vom Griechenland (with Cornelia Vismann; Internationaler Merve Diskurs Bd.240). Merve: Berlin. ISBN 3-88396-173-6
- 2002: Optische Medien. Merve: Berlin. ISBN 3-88396-183-3 (English edition: Optical Media, with an introduction by John Durham Peters. Polity Press 2010)
- 2002: Zwischen Rauschen und Offenbarung. Zur Kultur- und Mediengeschichte der Stimme (as publisher). Akademie Verlag, Berlin
- 2004: Unsterbliche. Nachrufe, Erinnerungen, Geistergespräche. Wilhelm Fink Verlag, Paderborn.
- 2006: Musik und Mathematik. Band 1: Hellas, Teil 1: Aphrodite. Wilhelm Fink Verlag, Paderborn.
- 2009: Musik und Mathematik. Band 1: Hellas, Teil 2: Eros. Wilhelm Fink Verlag, Paderborn.
- 2011: Das Nahen der Götter vorbereiten. Wilhelm Fink, Paderborn.
- 2013: Die Wahrheit der technischen Welt. Essays zur Genealogie der Gegenwart, Suhrkamp, Berlin. (English edition: The truth of the technological world: essays on the genealogy of presence, translated by Erik Butler, with an afterword by Hans Ulrich Gumbrecht. Stanford 2013.)
- 2013: Philosophien der Literatur. Merve, Berlin.
- 2013: Die Flaschenpost an die Zukunft. With Till Nikolaus von Heiseler, Kulturverlag Kadmos, Berlin.

=== Lectures ===
- Farben und/oder Maschinen denken
- Ontologie der Medien

=== Electronics ===
Somewhat uniquely among humanities professors, Kittler left behind a large digital output produced over ~30 years. These include D-Archive 1.0, and the contents of two PCs, some floppy drives, etc. He programmed in several programming languages, under different operating systems, starting with MS-DOS, followed by Unix. During 2000s, he worked under Gentoo Linux.

== See also ==
- Media influence
- Paul Virilio
