= Rut Blees Luxemburg =

German-born photographer

Rut Blees Luxemburg (born 1967) is a German-born British photographer. Her technique is to take photographs at night, mostly exploring the urban landscape. She is a Tutor at the Royal College of Art. In 2020, Luxemburg was awarded an Honorary Fellowship of the Royal Photographic Society, Bristol.

== Life and work ==
Luxemburg studied photography at London College of Communication and gained her last formal education at the University of Westminster. She employs long exposures that allow her to use the light emanating from the street only, for instance from office blocks or street lights in her photos. Luxemburg created a series of images for the London Underground in 2007. Many of her photographs and prints deal with nocturnal themes. In 2016, she was one of the judges in Sky Art's Master of Photography talent competition.

=== CD cover art ===
Her photograph, "Towering Inferno" was used as the cover art for The Streets' debut album Original Pirate Material. The photo depicts the beauty of a lit up council tower block. She also contributed "A Modern Project" for use as the cover of Bloc Party's second album, A Weekend in the City.

== Books ==
- The Lesson of the Vine / Die Lektion der Rebe. Everyday, 2019. ISBN 978-1-912458-07-3.
- Visurbia. With Martin Liebscher. Germany: Wunderhorn, 2000. ISBN 3-88423-173-1.
- London: A Modern Project. With Michael Bracewell. London: Black Dog, 2001. ISBN 1-901033-50-3.
- Liebeslied: My Suicides. With Alexander García Düttmann. London: Zwemmer, 1982. ISBN 1-901033-52-X
- Commonsensual: The Works of Rut Blees Luxemburg. With Regis Durand, Douglas Park, and Alexander Garcia Duttman. London: Black Dog, 2009. ISBN 1-906155-57-7.
- The Academic Year. London: Self Publish, Be Happy, 2014. With texts by Alexander and García Düttmann.
- The Lesson of the Vine, Die Lektion der Rebe. London : Everyday, 2019. With texts by Tom McCarthy, Chloe Arijidis, Fourthland, Ellen de Wachter, et al.

== Exhibitions ==
- 2011: The Rencontres d'Arles Discovery Award laureate. France.
