= Elmar Lampson =

German composer (born 1952)

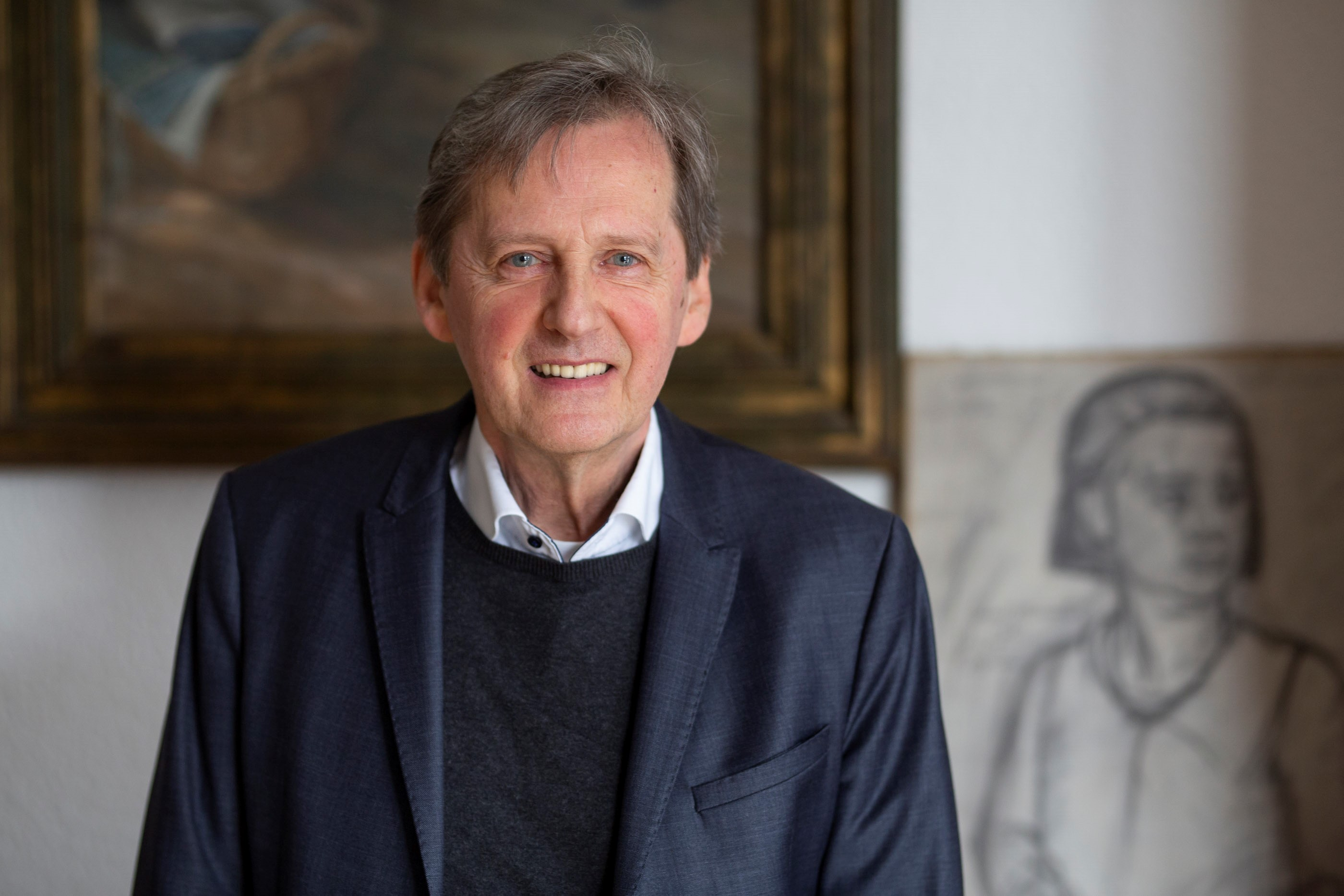
Elmar Lampson

Elmar Lampson (born 1952 in Koblenz) is a German composer.

He wrote two symphonies, solo- and chamber music, music for choir and an opera. His music is published by Peermusic Hamburg, New York and is available on various CDs, published by col legno, Vienna.

He writes essays on music-phenomenological topics and is co-editor of a series of books titled Copyrights, Kulturverlag Kadmos, Berlin (in collaboration with Dirk Baecker). As Dean of the Faculty of General Studies of the Witten/Herdecke University and as President of the University of Music and Drama Hamburg, Elmar Lampson has profoundly shaped and restructured graduate and undergraduate education at both universities for many years. At Witten/Herdecke, he also established and implemented a new curriculum for philosophy and humanities focusing on "Philosophie und Kulturreflexion".

He is Professor of Composition and Theory at the University of Music and Drama Hamburg and as well head of the Werner Richard - Dr. Carl Dörken-Chair for Phenomenology of Music at the University Witten/Herdecke.

== Bibliography ==
- Baecker Dirk & Lampson Elmar (eds.); Copyrights. Kulturverlag Kadmos, Berlin 2002, ISBN 3-931659-25-9 (Band 1).
- Lampson, Elmar; "Bildlichkeit im musikalischen Prozess" in: Bildlichkeit, Wittener kulturwissenschaftliche Schriften Bd. II, (Angela Martini und Dirk Rustemeyer, Editors.), Königshausen und Neumann, Würzburg 2003, ISBN 3-8260-2561-X
- Lampson, Elmar; "Die Formen der Hörfelder" in Formfelder - Genealogien von Ordnung, Wittener kulturwissenschaftliche Schriften Bd.V, (Angela Martini und Dirk Rustemeyer, Editors.), Königshausen und Neumann, Würzburg 2006, ISBN 3-8260-3315-9
