= Ludi magister =

A ludi magister was a teacher at a Roman school (Ludus). Magistri were often Greek or other educated slaves. The ludi magister was the teacher of the first stage of Roman education, the equivalent of an elementary school teacher. He would have a class of around thirty students. Students would go to a ludi magister at multiple ages and leave at the age of eleven. Classes would be held in a room rented by the ludi magister or outside.

== Role of a ludi magister ==
The subjects taught by a ludi magister were mainly reading and writing accompanied by a small knowledge of arithmetic and numbers. Teachers were allowed to employ corporal punishments if students were late or were disobedient and could be whipped.

Many Roman boys attended this first stage of education; there was a medium fee and the skills learnt were essential. The skills were reading and writing Greek and Latin. However, only very rich families sent their daughters to school and most taught their daughters themselves or had their son teach them. For a girl other household skills such as making fabric and cooking were more important. A child would often be sent with a slave, a paedagogus, to school who would carry equipment and make sure they got there safely.

The equipment used at this stage consisted of wax tablets (tabulae) which would be written on with a stick (stilus) with a pointed end for writing and a flat end for rubbing the wax back so it could be written on again. Also, papyrus rolls and quills with black and red ink could be used, almost an equivalent to paper and pens but papyrus rolls were much rougher. As well as that, the ink was more durable as it was made of soot and resin. This was thinned by adding water to the thick substance. Some of the more durable and costly inks have been known to survive years buried under the ground.

== Beyond the ludi magister ==
The second stage of Roman education was study under a grammaticus, and the third and final stage, only undertaken by young men from wealthy backgrounds, was instruction from a rhetor (the rhetor was almost always Greek and taught the art of public speaking). The ancient Romans did not have universities but they did have extra schooling taken by only the wealthiest families.

An account cited that it was the custom among the wealthy Romans to pursue liberal education and that their elementary years were spent studying with a grammaticus and later, a rhetor. On the other hand, the students who came from the lower class studied under the ludi magister, suggesting that this teacher instructed in some form of trade school. Indeed, a description of the school noted that the ludi magister's place of work was small, lowly, noisy, and a familiar part of the Roman life. It was also said that the ludi magister's school competed with other schools and so his goal was to have a large number of students to earn the approval of his master.

== See also ==
- Education in ancient Rome
