= Ottmar Ette =

German philologist (born 1956)

Ottmar Ette (born 14 December 1956 in Zell am Harmersbach, Black Forest, Germany) is Professor of Romance languages and Comparative literature at University of Potsdam and the author of two novels.

== Biographical notes ==
In 1990, Ottmar Ette completed his dissertation at University of Freiburg on the Spanish-American modernist and Cuban national icon José Martí. In 1995, his habilitation on French post-modern theorist Roland Barthes was accepted at Catholic University of Eichstätt-Ingolstadt. In 2001, Ette received the "Hugo Friedrich und Erich Köhler"-award for his work on Roland Barthes from Freiburg University. Twice, he has been granted fellowships in advanced-study institutions. He has lectured and taught in a number of Latin-American and European countries, as well as in the USA. He has been a full professor Romance literature and comparative literature in Potsdam since 1995. To Ottmar Ette, Romance philology is a wide-ranging and inclusive academic field of inquiry that connects a number of disciplines and languages as it tells us about literary knowledge of human life.

Since 2013, Ottmar Ette has been a member of the Berlin-Brandenburg Academy of Sciences and Humanities. In 2014, he was elected honorary member of the Modern Language Association of America. In 2014, Ottmar Ette received the Mexican Research Award "Escuela Nacional de Altos Estudios" from the Universidad Nacional Autónoma de México.

Ottmar Ette has been a Chevalier of the Ordre des Palmes Académiques (France) since 2012. He has been a regular member of the Academia Europaea since 2010. Also in 2010, he was a fellow at the Freiburg Institute for Advanced Studies. This was after having already received a fellowship at the Wissenschaftskolleg zu Berlin Institute for Advanced Study in 2004/2005. He has been involved in establishing a number of state-funded "Graduiertenkolleg"-graduate schools at German universities. He is a co-founder of a research-network on Latin America in the wider Berlin area, ForLaBB (Forschungsverbund Lateinamerika Berlin-Brandenburg).

He is founder and co-editor of the electronic journal HiN - Alexander von Humboldt im Netz (ISSN 1617-5239) and an online platform dedicated to von Humboldt avhumboldt.de - Humboldt Informationen online. Ette is also co-editor of the journal Iberoamericana (Madrid - Frankfurt am Main). Since 2009, he has also been co-editor of the electronic journal Istmo (Revista virtual de estudios literarios y culturales centroamericanos), (ISSN 1535-2315).

== Research ==
The research and teaching of Ottmar Ette focus on: Alexander von Humboldt, literary studies as a science of life, living-together or "conviviality", and TransArea Studies: poetics of movement and Francophone and Hispanophone literatures inside and outside Europe.

Ette directs the Research Project on "Alexander von Humboldt's American Travel Diaries: Genealogy, Chronology, and Epistemology" (2014–2017) and, since 2015, an 18-year project on "Travelling Humboldt - Science on the Move" of the Berlin-Brandenburg Academy of Sciences and Humanities (http://www.bbaw.de/en/research/avh-r).

== Fiction ==
Ottmar Ette's debut novel, Zwei deutsche Leben ("Two German Lives"), was published in 2023. The work blends scholarly research on the biographies of scientists with fictional storytelling, combining elements of a historical novel and a thriller. In 2024, Ette released his second novel, Mein Name sei Amo ("Let My Name Be Amo"), which centers on Anton Wilhelm Amo, the first Black philosopher active in the German-speaking world during the first half of the 18th century. Ette's narrative integrates features of the historical novel with elements of the conte philosophique, in the tradition of Voltaire. In 2025, Ette published the novel Wunder Bunker, which deals with the construction of the largest bunker in Germany during the 1940s and its use in the immediate post-war period. The novel combines historical and allegorical elements, highlighting continuities between Nazism and the Wirtschaftswunder. Told from the perspective of a seagull, the story takes the form of a parable and an animal fable exploring the tensions between violence, guilt and aesthetic resistance.

== Interests and influence ==
Ottmar Ette's programmatic essay "Literaturwissenschaft als Lebenswissenschaft - Eine Programmschrift im Jahr der Geisteswissenschaften" sparked wide-ranging reactions and discussion in Germany. Among many other publications, the theme reappeared in the national weekly paper Die Zeit. The basic thrust of Ette's argument is to reconceptualize literary studies in terms of a science of life or "life science": "Lebenswissenschaft". Literature, Ette claims, is an essential repository of human knowledge on life, especially with respect to ethically relevant experiences such as living-together or "conviviality", migration and belonging, or survival in times of existential danger. The term "Lebenswissenschaft" is coined to oppose and call into question the increasing dominance of the biological or medical "life sciences", that have begun to monopolize and reduce concept and semantics of human life. Ette recently presented his argument in English in the Modern Language Association's PMLA.

Ottmar Ette has also received much attention for his work on and editions of the writings of Alexander von Humboldt. He is considered a leading specialist on Humboldt's original scientific approach and extremely prolific work. Whereas Alexander von Humboldt has always been a well-known figure in the Americas, German reception had been heavily focused on the philological work of his older brother, Wilhelm von Humboldt. Ette's new editions of Alexander's colourful reports from his voyages have led to a more evenly balanced reception of the work of the two polymaths Alexander and Wilhelm von Humboldt. As early as 1987, Ette's work on Alexander von Humboldt earned him the "Heinz-Maier-Leibnitz" Award from the German Ministry of Culture and the German Research Association DFG. In the English-speaking world, Ottmar Ette and Vera M. Kutzinski (Vanderbildt University) recently published two critical editions of Humboldt's works: in 2011, the "Political Essay on the Island of Cuba; in 2012, the "Views of the Cordilleras and Monuments of the Indigenous Peoples of the Americas", both titles published with the University of Chicago Press.

== Publications ==
=== Fiction ===
- Zwei deutsche Leben. (Berlin: Kulturverlag Kadmos, 2023)
- Mein Name sei Amo (Berlin: Kulturverlag Kadmos, 2024)
- Wunder Bunker (Berlin: Kulturverlag Kadmos, 2025)

=== Monographs (selected titles) ===
- José Martí (Niemeyer 1991; trans. Mexico: UNAM, 1995)
- Roland Barthes (Frankfurt: Suhrkamp, 1998)
- Literatur in Bewegung (Velbrück Wissenschaft 2001; trans. Literature on the move. New York, Amsterdam: Rodopi; Spanish: Literatura en movimiento. Madrid: CSIC, 2008)
- Weltbewusstsein. Alexander von Humboldt und das unvollendete Projekt einer anderen Moderne (Weilerswist: Velbrück Wissenschaft, 2002)
- ÜberLebenswissen. Die Aufgabe der Philologie (Berlin: Kulturverlag Kadmos, 2004)
- ZwischenWeltenSchreiben. Literaturen ohne festen Wohnsitz (ÜberLebenswissen II) (Berlin: Kulturverlag Kadmos, 2005)
- Alexander von Humboldt und die Globalisierung (Frankfurt: Insel, 2009)
- Del macrocosmos al microrrelato. Literatura y creación – nuevas perspectivas transareales (Guatemala: F&G Editores, 2009)
- ZusammenLebensWissen. List, Last und Lust literarischer Konvivenz im globalen Maßstab (ÜberLebenswissen III). (Berlin: Kulturverlag Kadmos, 2010)
- LebensZeichen. Roland Barthes zur Einführung (Hamburg: Junius, 2011)
- Konvivenz. Literatur und Leben nach dem Paradies (Berlin: Kulturverlag Kadmos, 2012)
- TransArea. Eine literarische Globalisierungsgeschichte (Berlin, Boston: De Gruyter, 2012)
- Viellogische Philologie. Die Literaturen der Welt und das Beispiel einer transarealen peruanischen Literatur (Berlin: Walter Frey, 2013)
- Roland Barthes: Landschaften der Theorie (Paderborn: Konstanz University Press, 2013)
- Anton Wilhelm Amo: Philosophieren ohne festen Wohnsitz (Berlin: Kulturverlag Kadmos, 2014)
- SaberSobreViver: A (o) missão da filologia (Paraná: Editora UFPR, 2015)
- Writing-between-Worlds. TransArea Studies and the Literatures-without-a-fixed-Abode. Translated by Vera M. Kutzinsky (Berlin - Boston: Walter de Gruyter, 2016)
- Der Fall Jauss. Wege des Verstehens in eine Zukunft der Philologie (Berlin: Kulturverlag Kadmos, 2016)
- TransArea. A Literary History of Globalization. Translated by Mark W. Person (Berlin - Boston: Walter de Gruyter, 2016)
- WeltFraktale. Wege durch die Literaturen der Welt (Stuttgart: J.B. Metzler Verlag, 2017)
- Filología polilógica. Las literaturas del mundo y el ejemplo de una literatura peruana transareal (Granada: Editorial Universidad de Granada, 2017).
- El caso Jauss. Caminos de la comprensión hacia un futuro de la filología (México D.F.: Almadía, 2018).
- EscreverEntreMundos. Literaturas sem morada fixa (SaberSobreViver II). Tradução Rosani Umbach, Dionei Mathias, Teruco Arimoto Spengler (Curitiba: Editora UFPR (Série pesquisa, 347), 2018).
- Alexander von Humboldt y la globalización. El saber en movimiento. Traducción de Johanna Malcher. (México: El Colegio de México, 2019).
- O Caso Jauss. A compreensão a caminho de um futuro para a filologia. Tradução de Giovanna Chaves. Apresentação de Regina Zilberman (Goiânia: Caminhos, 2019).
- Alexander von Humboldt: la aventura del saber. Nuevos ensayos humboldtianos a 250 años de su nacimiento (Guatemala: F & G Editores, 2019).
- Mobile Preußen. Ansichten jenseits des Nationalen. Stuttgart: J.B. Metzler Verlag, 2019 [XVI + 222 pp.].
- TransArea. Une histoire littéraire de la mondialisation. Traduction de Chloé Chaudet. Préface de Jean-Marc Moura. Paris: Classiques Garnier (Collection «Bibliothèques francophones», 8) 2019 [443 pp.].
- Alexander von Humboldt und die Globalisierung. Das Mobile des Wissens. Berlin: Suhrkamp Verlag (suhrkamp taschenbuch, 4967), 2019 [476 pp.].
- L'Affaire Jauss. Les chemins de la compréhension vers un avenir de la philologie. Traduit de l'allemand par Robert Kahn. Mont-Saint-Aignan: Presses universitaires de Rouen et du Havre, 2019 [135 pp.].

=== Edited volumes (selected titles) ===
- La escritura de la memoria. Reinaldo Arenas: Textos, estudios y documentación (Madrid, Frankfurt am Main: Vervuert, 1992)
- José Martí 1895 / 1995. Literatura - Política - Filosofía - Estética (Madrid, Frankfurt am Main: Vervuert, 1994)
- Ansichten Amerikas. Neuere Studien zu Alexander von Humboldt (Madrid, Frankfurt am Main: Vervuert 2001)
- Dossier: Max Aub: Inéditos y Revelaciones (Madrid: Revista de Occidente 265, June 2003)
- ArabAmericas. Literary Entanglements of the American Hemisphere and the Arab World (Madrid, Frankfurt am Main: Vervuert, 2006)
- Caribbeans on the Move. Archipiélagos literarios del Caribe. A TransArea Symposium (Frankfurt am Main: Peter Lang, 2008)
- EuropeAmericas. Transatlantische Beziehungen (Madrid, Frankfurt am Main: Vervuert, 2008)
- Literaturwissenschaft als Lebenswissenschaft. Programm - Projekte - Perspektiven (Tübingen: Narr Francke Attempto, 2010)
- Caleidoscopios coloniales. Transferencias culturales en el Caribe del siglo XIX. Kaléidoscopes coloniaux. Transferts culturels dans les Caraïbes au XIXe siècle (Madrid, Frankfurt am Main: Vervuert, 2010)
- Trans(it)Areas. Convivencias en Centroamérica y el Caribe. Un simposio transareal (Berlin: Walter Frey - edition tranvía, 2011)
- Wissensformen und Wissensnormen des ZusammenLebens. Literatur - Kultur - Geschichte - Medien (Berlin, Boston: De Gruyter, 2012).
- El Caribe como paradigma. Convivencias y coincidencias históricas, culturales y estéticas. Un simposio transareal (Berlin: Walter Frey - edition tranvía, 2012)
- Alexander von Humboldt and the Americas (Berlin: Walter Frey - edition tranvía, 2012).
- Worldwide. Archipels de la mondialisation. Archipiélagos de la globalización. A TransArea Symposium (Madrid, Frankfurt am Main: Vervuert, 2012).
- Wort Macht Stamm. Rassismus und Determinismus in der Philologie (18./19. Jh.) (München: Fink, 2013).
- LebensMittel. Essen und Trinken in den Künsten und Kulturen (Zürich: diaphanes, 2013).
- TransPacífico. Conexiones y convivencias en AsiAméricas. Un simposio transareal (Berlin: Walter Frey - edition tranvía, 2013).
- Imaginarios del miedo. Estudios desde la historia (Berlin: Walter Frey - edition tranvía, 2013).
- Unfälle der Sprache. Literarische und philologische Erkundungen der Katastrophe (Wien/Berlin: Turia + Kant, 2014).
- Nach der Hybridität. Zukünfte der Kulturtheorie (Berlin - edition tranvía, 2014).
- Paisajes vitales. Conflictos, catástrofes y convivencias en Centroamérica y el Caribe (Berlin: edition tranvía, 2014).
- Europa als Archipel / L'Europe comme archipel. In: Lendemains (Tübingen) XXXIX, 154–155 (2014), pp. 226–266.
- La filología como ciencia de la vida (Mexiko D. F.: Universidad Iberoamericana, 2015).
- Visualisierung, Visibilisierung und Verschriftlichung. Schrift-Bilder und Bild-Schriften im Frankreich des 19. Jahrhunderts (Berlin: edition tranvía, 2015).
- Políticas y estrategias de la crítica: ideología, historia y actores de los estudios literarios (Madrid - Frankfurt am Main: Iberoamericana - Vervuert, 2016).
- New Orleans and the Global South. Caribbean, Creolization, Carnival (Hildesheim - Zürich - New York: Georg Olms Verlag, 2017).
- Forster - Humboldt - Chamisso. Weltreisende im Spannungsfeld der Kulturen (with J. Drews, T. Kraft, B. Schneider-Kempf, J. Weber, 2017).
- Landschaften und Kartographien der Humboldt'schen Wissenschaft (with J. Drews, 2017).
- Alexander von Humboldt-Handbuch. Leben - Werk - Wirkung (2018).

=== Text editions and translations (selected titles) ===
- A.v.Humboldt: Reise in die Äquinoktial-Gegenden (2 vols., Frankfurt am Main: Insel, 1991)
- José Enrique Rodó: Ariel (Mainz: Dieterich'sche Verlagsbuchhandlung, 1994)
- A.v.Humboldt: Kosmos. Ed. with O. Lubrich (Frankfurt am Main: Eichborn, 2004)
- A.v.Humboldt: Ansichten der Kordilleren und Monumente der eingeborenen Völker Amerikas. Ed. with O. Lubrich (Frankfurt am Main: Eichborn Verlag, 2004)
- A.v.Humboldt: Über einen Versuch den Gipfel des Chimborazo zu ersteigen. Ed. with O. Lubrich (Frankfurt am Main: Eichborn Verlag, 2006)
- A.v.Humboldt: Kritische Untersuchung zur historischen Entwicklung der geographischen Kenntnisse von der Neuen Welt und den Fortschritten der nautischen Astronomie im 15. und 16. Jahrhundert. (Frankfurt am Main: Insel Verlag, 2009)
- Barthes, Roland: Die Lust am Text (Berlin: Suhrkamp Verlag 2010)
- A.v.Humboldt: Political Essay on the Island of Cuba. A Critical Edition. Ed. with V. M. Kutzinski (Chicago - London: The University of Chicago Press, 2011)
- A.v.Humboldt: Views of the Cordilleras and Monuments of the Indigenous Peoples of the Americas. A Critical Edition. Ed. with V. M. Kutzinski (Chicago - London: The University of Chicago Press, 2012)
- A.v.Humboldt: Bilder-Welten. Die Zeichnungen aus den Amerikanischen Reisetagebüchern. (mit Julia Maier, 2018).
- A.v.Humboldt: Das Buch der Begegnungen. Menschen - Kulturen - Geschichten aus den Amerikanischen Reisetagebüchern. Herausgegeben, aus dem Französischen übersetzt und kommentiert von Ottmar Ette. (2018).

=== Journal and book articles (selected titles in English) ===
- "Khal Torabully. «Coolies» and corals, or living in transarchipelagic worlds." In: Journal of the African Literature Association (London), XI, 1 (2017), pp. 112–119.
- "Toward a Polylogical Philology of the Literatures of the World." In: Modern Language Quarterly (Seattle), LXXVII, 2 (June 2016), pp. 143–173.
- "Magic Screens. Biombos, Namban Art, the Art of Globalization and Education between China, Japan, India, Spanish America and Europe in the 17th and 18th Centuries." In: European Review (Cambridge), XXIV, 2 (May 2016), pp. 285–296.
- (with Vera M. Kutzinski) "The Art of Science: Alexander von Humboldt's Views of the Cultures of the World." In: Humboldt, Alexander von: Views of the Cordilleras and Monuments of the Indigenous Peoples of the Americas. A Critical Edition. Edited with an Introduction by Vera M. Kutzinski and Ottmar Ette. Translated by J. Ryan Poynter. With Annotations by Giorleny D. Altamirano Rayo and Tobias Kraft. Chicago - London: The University of Chicago Press, 2012, pp. xv–xxxv.
- "Worldwide: Living in Transarchipelagic Worlds." In: Ette, Ottmar / Müller, Gesine (eds.): Worldwide. Archipels de la mondialisation. Archipiélagos de la globalización. A TransArea Symposium. Madrid - Frankfurt am Main: Iberoamericana - Vervuert, 2012, pp. 21–59.
- "TransTropics: Alexander von Humboldt and Hemispheric Constructions." In: Kutzinski, Vera M. / Ette, Ottmar / Walls, Laura Dassow (eds.): Alexander von Humboldt and the Americas. Berlin: Verlag Walter Frey - edition tranvía, 2012, pp. 209–236.
- "Archeologies of Globalization. European Reflections on Two Phases of Accelerated Globalization in Cornelius de Pauw, Georg Forster, Guillaume-Thomas Raynal and Alexander von Humboldt". In: Culture & History Digital Journal (Madrid) I, 1 (June 2012)
- "Everything is interrelated, even the errors in the system: Alexander von Humboldtd and globalization." In: Kutzinski, Vera M. (ed.): Alexander von Humboldt's Transatlantic Personae. London - New York: Routledge - Taylor & Francis Group, 2012, pp. 15–28.
- "Listening to the Jungle or Life as Sound. Alexander von Humboldt's «Noctirnal Aniimal Life in the Jungle» and the Humboldt Effect." In: Wagner, Peter / Ogée, Frédéric (eds.): Taste and the Senses in the Eighteenth Century. Trier: Wissenschaftsverlag Trier, 2011, pp. 221–238.
- "Urbanity and Literature - Cities as Transareal Spaces of Movement in Assia Djebar, Emine Sevgi Özdamar and Cécile Wajsbrot." In: European Review (Cambridge) XIX, 3 (2011), pp. 367–383.
- "Not just brought about by chance": reflections on globalisation in Cornelius de Pauw and Alexander von Humboldt." In: Studies in Travel Writing (Nottingham) XV, 1 (February 2011), pp. 3-25.
- "Literature as Knowledge for Living, Literary Studies as Science for Living." Edited, translated, and with an introduction by Vera M. Kutzinski. In: Special Topic: «Literary Criticism for the Twenty-First Century», coordinated by Cathy Caruth and Jonathan Culler, in: PMLA. Publications of the Modern Language Association of America (New York) CXXV, 4 (October 2010), pp. 977–993.
- "Everything is interrelated, even the errors in the system: Alexander von Humboldt and globalization." In: Atlantic Studies (London - New York), VII, 2 (June 2010), pp. 113–126.
- "European Literature(s) in the Global Context - Literatures for Europe." In: D'haen, Theo / Goerlandt, Iannis (eds.): Literature for Europe? Amsterdam - New York: Rodopi, 2009, pp. 123–160.
- "A Literature of No Fixed Abode. Fictions and Frictions in Cuba's Literary Landscape." In: Hatzky, Christine / Zeuske, Michael (ed.): Cuba en 1902. Después del imperio - una nueva nación. Münster: LIT Verlag, 2008, pp. 38–64.
- "Arab-Caribbean origins: on the transareal dimension in Amin Maalouf's literary work. Coming home to the familiar unknown." In (idem., ed.): Caribbean(s) on the Move - Archipiélagos literarios del Caribe. A TransArea Symposium. Frankfurt am Main - New York - Oxford: Peter Lang, 2008, pp. 143–165.
- "Towards World Science? Humboldtian Science, World Concepts, and TransArea Studies". In: Rehrmann, Norbert / Ramírez Sáinz, Laura (eds.): Dos culturas en diálogo. Historia cultural de la naturaleza, la técnica y las ciencias naturales en España y América Latina. Madrid - Frankfurt am Main: Iberoamericana - Vervuert, 2007, pp. 121–150.
- "Islands, Borders and Vectors: The Fractal World of the Caribbean." In: D'hulst, Lieven / Moura, Jean-Marc / De Bleeker, Liesbeth / Lie, Nadia (eds.): Caribbean Interfaces. Amsterdam - New York: Rodopi, 2007, pp. 109–151.
- "Chronicle of a Clash Foretold? ArabAmerican Dimensions and Transareal Relations in Gabriel García Márquez and Elias Khoury." In: Ette, Ottmar / Pannewick, Friederike (eds.): ArabAmericas. Literary Entanglements of the American Hemisphere and the Arab World. Frankfurt am Main - Madrid: Vervuert Verlag - Iberoamericana, 2006, pp. 215–262.
- "Literatures without a Fixed Abode. Figures of Vectorial Imagination Beyond the Dichotomies of National and World Literature." In: Ette, Ottmar / Pannewick, Friederike (eds.): ArabAmericas. Literary Entanglements of the American Hemisphere and the Arab World. Frankfurt am Main - Madrid: Vervuert Verlag - Iberoamericana, 2006, pp. 19–68.
- "Gender Trouble: José Martí and Juana Borrero." In: Font, Mauricio A. / Quiroz, Alfonso W. (eds.): The Cuban Republic and José Martí. Reception and Use of a National Symbol. Lanham - Boulder - New York - Toronto - Oxford: Lexington Books, 2006, pp. 180–193 u. 230–233.
