= TwinKomplex =

Browser video game

- Developer: Martin Burckardt
- Publisher: Ludic Philosophy
- Writers: Martin Burckardt; Florian Evers; Dirk Höfer; Javier Krawietz
- Composer: Johannes Reich
- Release: 15 November 2011

TwinKomplex is a browser game created by the Berlin-based start-up Ludic Philosophy. The company was founded in 2010 in Berlin by the German cultural theorist Martin Burckhardt. He created and developed TwinKomplex.

TwinKomplex is an interactive social game which interweaves film, literary narrative, photography, design, and game to form a new genre of transmedial storytelling. German and English versions of the game are online and free2play as of November 15, 2011. According to the company a Spanish version of the game is scheduled to follow.

== Story and gameplay ==
When a new player logs in, they are given a test to determine whether they are qualified to work undercover for a mysterious secret agency. The Decentral Intelligence Agency, or DIA, is based out of Berlin and runs operations around the globe. Agents of the DIA work cooperatively with an invisible network of other agents and structures to address themes and facets affecting contemporary society.

The game unfolds in a series of 12-episode-long seasons, in a release format similar to that of a television program. Over the course of an episode, which represents a week of game play, the player solves a case together with three other agents (online co-players). The cases include murders, kidnappings, political and economic crimes, ecological disasters and miscarriages of justice. The agent-players examine evidence in the form of documents, messages, videos, photographs, audio recordings and other objects, which spur the agents to follow many different leads, some of which lead to the cracking of the case.

The game, characterized as "neo-analogue" by its makers, works without avatars and 3-D animation. Rather, the non-player characters, or NPCs, are acted by an international cast of actors. The dramaturgy of the game, therefore, unfolds in filmed live-action scenes. Members of the cast include Dieter Bach as Richard Wagener, Irm Hermann as Marlene Girlinger, Anne Ratte-Polle as Anne Sievert, Bernhard Schütz as Maximilian/Benjamin van der Graaf, Christian Brückner as Anton Kaspers, Gerd Wameling as the Officiant, and Christine Utterberg as Virginia Bradford.

== Engine ==
TwinKomplex runs on an engine which was developed in-house for the unique needs of the game. The engine needed to be more sophisticated than previous platforms in order to allow for the complexity and transmediality of the game.

== Sources ==
- Schubert, Markus; Stoppe, Sebastian (2015). "Gleichzeitig real und virtuell?, Mashups aus Nutzersicht: Das Beispiel TwinKomplex". In Wilke, Thomas; Mundhenke, Florian; Ramos Arenas, Fernando (eds.). Mashups, Neue Praktiken und Ästhetiken in populären Medienkulturen. Wiesbaden: Springer. pp. 261–280. ISBN 978-3-658-05752-7.
