= Matthias A. K. Zimmermann =

Swiss writer, painter and new media artist

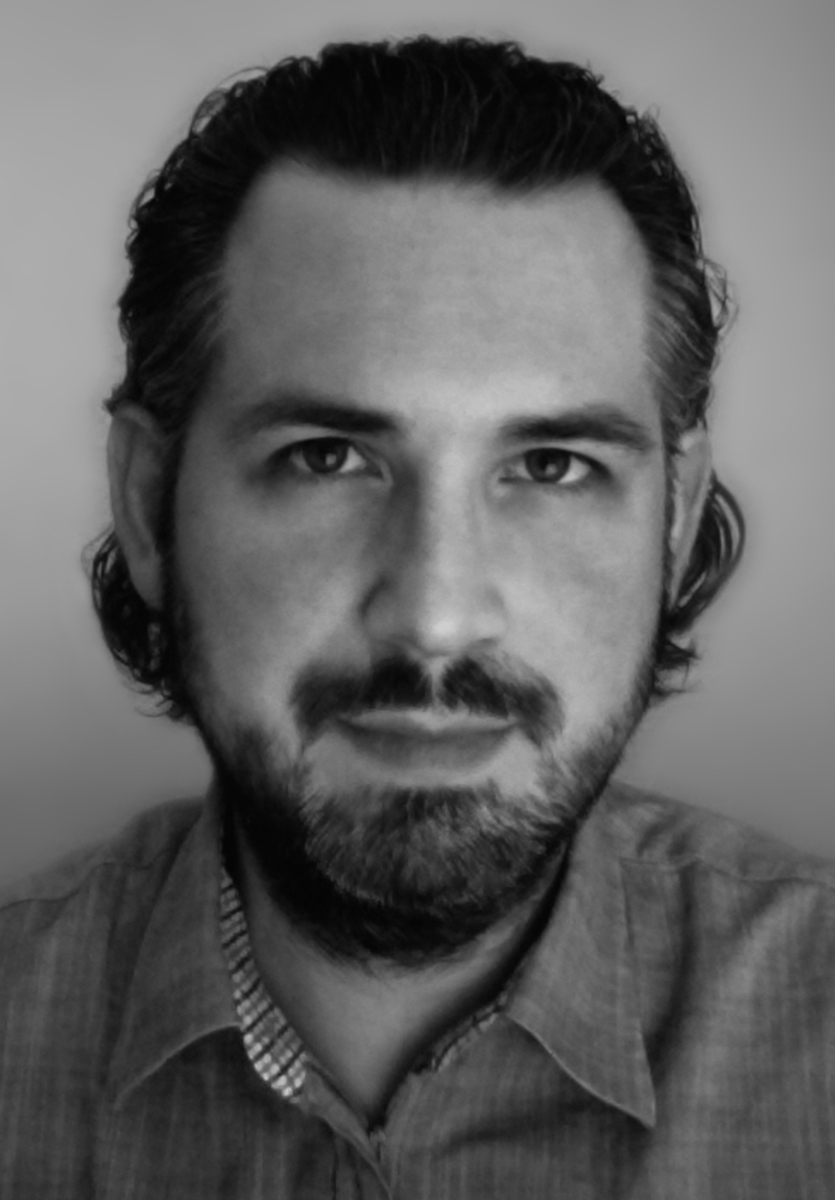
- Born: Matthias Alexander Kristian Zimmermann; 6 May 1981 (age 45); Basel, Switzerland
- Education: University of Fine art, University of education
- Known for: Writer, Painting, New media art, Video game art

Matthias Alexander Kristian Zimmermann (born 6 May 1981 in Basel) is a writer, painter and new media artist from Switzerland.

The Frozen City, 2006 Acrylic on canvas, 160 × 160 cm (63 in × 63 in) Museum of Art Aarau, Switzerland

The Space Machine 6, 2013 Acrylic on canvas, 100 × 280 cm (39.4 x 110 in) Computer Museum Kiel, Germany

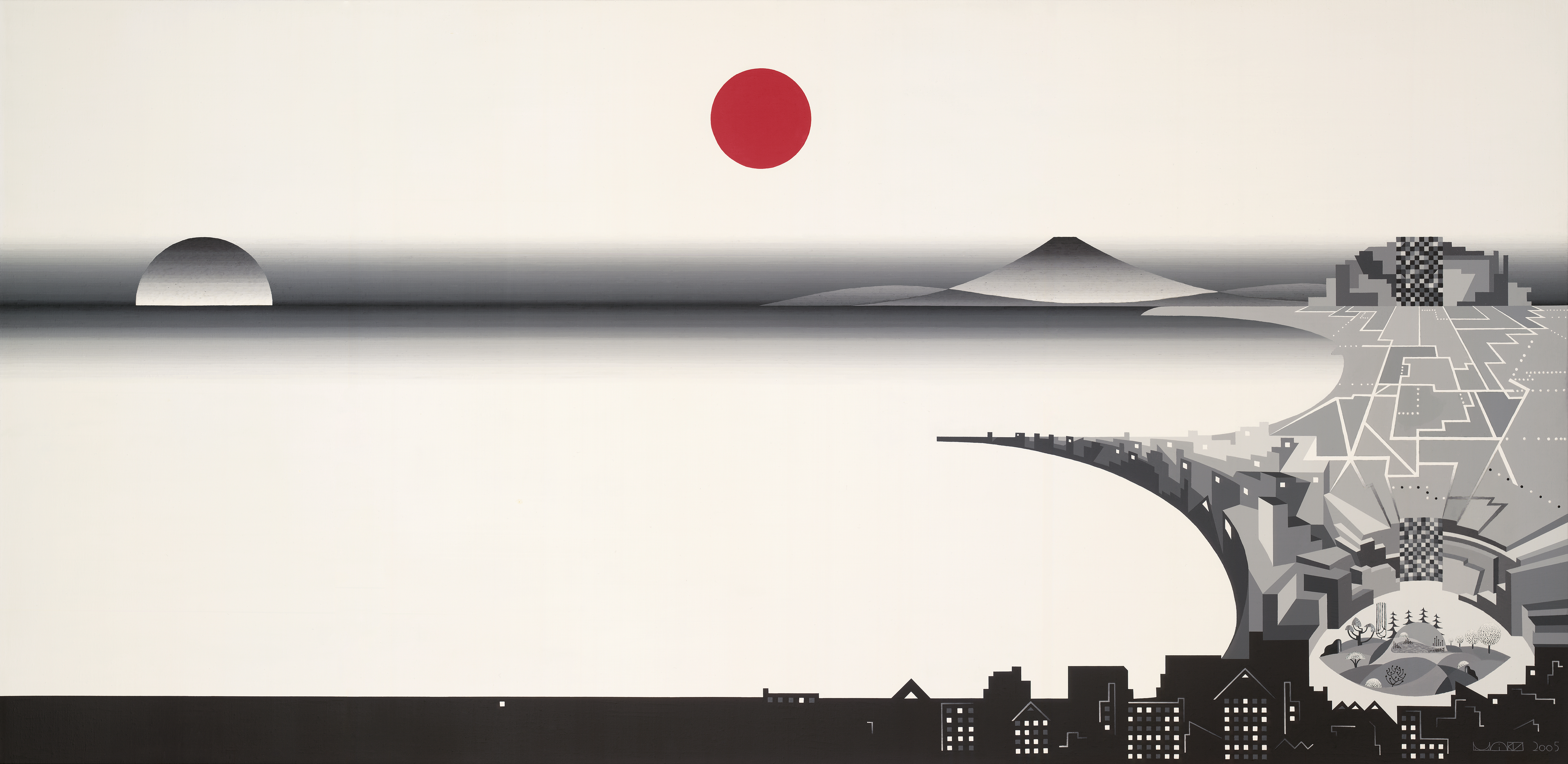
The Networked City, 2005 Acrylic on canvas, 100 × 205 cm (39.4 in × 80.7 in) Museums Quarter, St. Annen-Museum, Germany

Moonlight in the Snow Clouds, 2009 Acrylic on canvas, 160 × 180 cm (63 in × 70.9 in) Ludwig Museum of Art

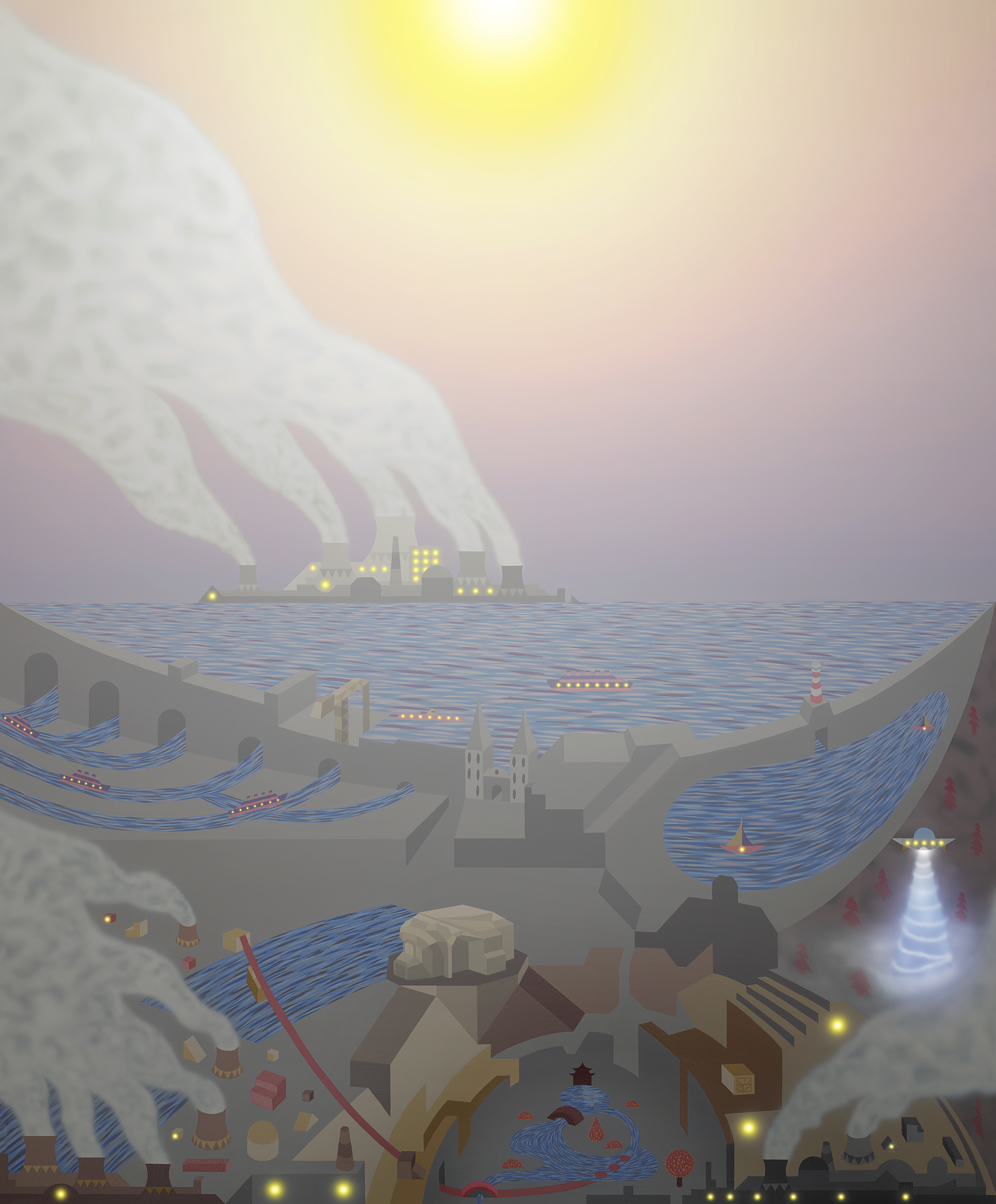
Interaction between nine Energy Centres, 2011 Acrylic on canvas, 140 × 170 cm (55.1 in × 67 in) Ludwig Museum of Art

== Biography ==
Matthias A. K. Zimmermann was born in Basel and grew up in the canton of Aargau. He studied music/composition at the University of Arts Berne, fine art at the Lucerne University of Applied Sciences and Arts, game design and art education at the Zurich University of Applied Sciences and didactics/pedagogy at the Swiss Federal Institute for Vocational Education and Training (SFIVET). His artistic work has found a reception in international exhibitions as well as in scientific and essayistic texts. Zimmermann's artworks are in collections of various museums. His debut novel, CRYONIUM, has been published by Kulturverlag Kadmos (Kadmos Publisher).

== Work ==
=== Literary work ===
==== Literary Concept and Connection to His Own Art ====
Zimmermann’s fictional worlds emerge from the concepts underlying his modular image compositions. His narratives likewise follow a modular, building-block principle. Palindromes, numeric sequences, anagrams, and codes form the formal building blocks. Time travel and spatial configurations, as well as the themes of transience and infinity, are among the variable components of his narrative system. The book covers he designs incorporate motifs from his paintings, which in turn appear within the narrative. The writing process can take up to ten years, as Zimmermann constructs his fictional worlds with the intricate precision of a clockwork.

==== Novels (in German) ====
- KRYONIUM. Die Experimente der Erinnerung. Novel. First publication: Kulturverlag Kadmos, Berlin 2019. New edition: Edition Modellwelten / BoD, Hamburg 2025, ISBN 978-3-8192-8019-1
- INTOXIKATION. Chemie der Illusionen. Psychological thriller. (Authors: Matthias A. K. Zimmermann, Kristina Schippling). First publication: Kulturverlag Kadmos, Berlin 2024. New edition: Edition Modellwelten / BoD, Hamburg 2025, ISBN 978-3-8192-4779-8
- IMITATHYOS. Das unendliche Alphabet. Novel. Edition Modellwelten / BoD, Hamburg 2024, ISBN 978-3-8370-6776-7
- YOGAMINO. Im Zickzack der Zeit und Ruckzuck der Räume. Novel. Edition Modellwelten / BoD, Hamburg 2026, ISBN 978-3-6957-4228-8

=== Artistic work ===
==== Content, concept and execution ====
Zimmermann's artistic works, which he refers to as "Model Worlds", contain a smorgasbord of visual languages borrowed from digital space, the vocabulary of different cultures, and the history of art, design, and media. Computer game elements, source codes, japanese gardens, Buddhist symbolism, and icon paintings from the Middle Ages can be found predominantly. The pictorial motifs show landscapes in varying degrees of abstraction. This ranges from photorealistic, clearly recognizable places to spatial entities. The pictorial motifs convey both cheerful and gloomy atmospheres that paraphrase utopian and dystopian scenarios. The staging of the pictorial space using things from different times and places illustrates the simultaneity of virtual distance resolution. The geometric frameworks of the pictorial contents result from the most Miscellaneous perspectives and spatial representations. Each picture is based on a system that is constructed like a construction kit or puzzle and illustrates the playful concept of modularity – the variable combination, transformation, and ever new composition. The "Model Worlds" are designed as paintings on canvas or digitally constructed on the computer and implemented as Diasec. Each painting is preceded by meticulous sketch studies that last for months or years. Zimmermann's creative process reflects the interface of the analog and digital. His painting technique adapts the aesthetics of computer images, whereas his digitally created pictures mostly refer to motifs of classical painting.

==== Artistic Research ====
The art book Digital Modernity (Hirmer Publishers), published in 2018, discusses Zimmermann's work primarily under the aspect of artistic research. By combining elements of aesthetic mediation with those of the knowledge system, new epistemological spaces are opened up for the reception of art. The "Model Worlds" form a topology through space and time, research in the history of art, design and media, and point out technical connections. The series of pictures, The Space Machine, layers the picture content in six levels – energy, hardware, binary code, 3D graphics software, game world (electronic visual display), source codes – and illustrates the construction of digital worlds. Among other things, the source codes shown have the function of source references.

== Museums ==
=== Exhibitions ===
- Museum of Art Aarau, Switzerland: Selection 11, 2011
- Art Museum of Lucerne, Switzerland: Annual Exhibition, 2011
- Computer Games Museum Berlin, Germany: Model Worlds – Pictures by Matthias Zimmermann, 2013
- Computer Games Museum Berlin/Institution of Digital Culture, Germany: Supersample – Pixels at an Exhibition, 2015
- Museet for Religiøs Kunst, Denmark: Vokseværk, 2015
- St. Anne's Museum Quarter, Lübeck/Landeshaus Kiel, Germany: KunSt aktuell im LandesHaus, 2015
- Ludwig Museum of Art, Germany: Matthias Zimmermann – From Videogame towards the Apocalypse, 2016
- Ludwig Museum of Art, Germany: The Known and the Unknown, 2019
- Museum of Art Aarau, Switzerland: Selection 19, 2019

=== Inventory ===
Artwork by Matthias A. K. Zimmermann are in the permanent collection of the following museums and cultural institutions

- Technisches Museum Wien, Vienna, Austria
- Odysseum – Science Center, Germany
- Ludwig Museum of Art, Germany
- Museum of Art Aarau, Switzerland
- Buchheim Museum of Fantasy, Germany
- Tucson Museum of Art and Historic Block, USA
- MoFA – Florida State University / Museum of Fine Arts, USA
- St. Anne's Museum Quarter, Lübeck, Germany
- Museum für Kommunikation Frankfurt, Germany
- Museum of Art Göppingen, Germany
- Computer Museum Kiel, Germany
- Computer Games Museum Berlin, Germany
- Toy Museum, Germany
- Museum of Contemporary Art – Collection Hurrle, Germany
- Museet for Religiøs Kunst, Denmark
- Department of Music, University of Innsbruck
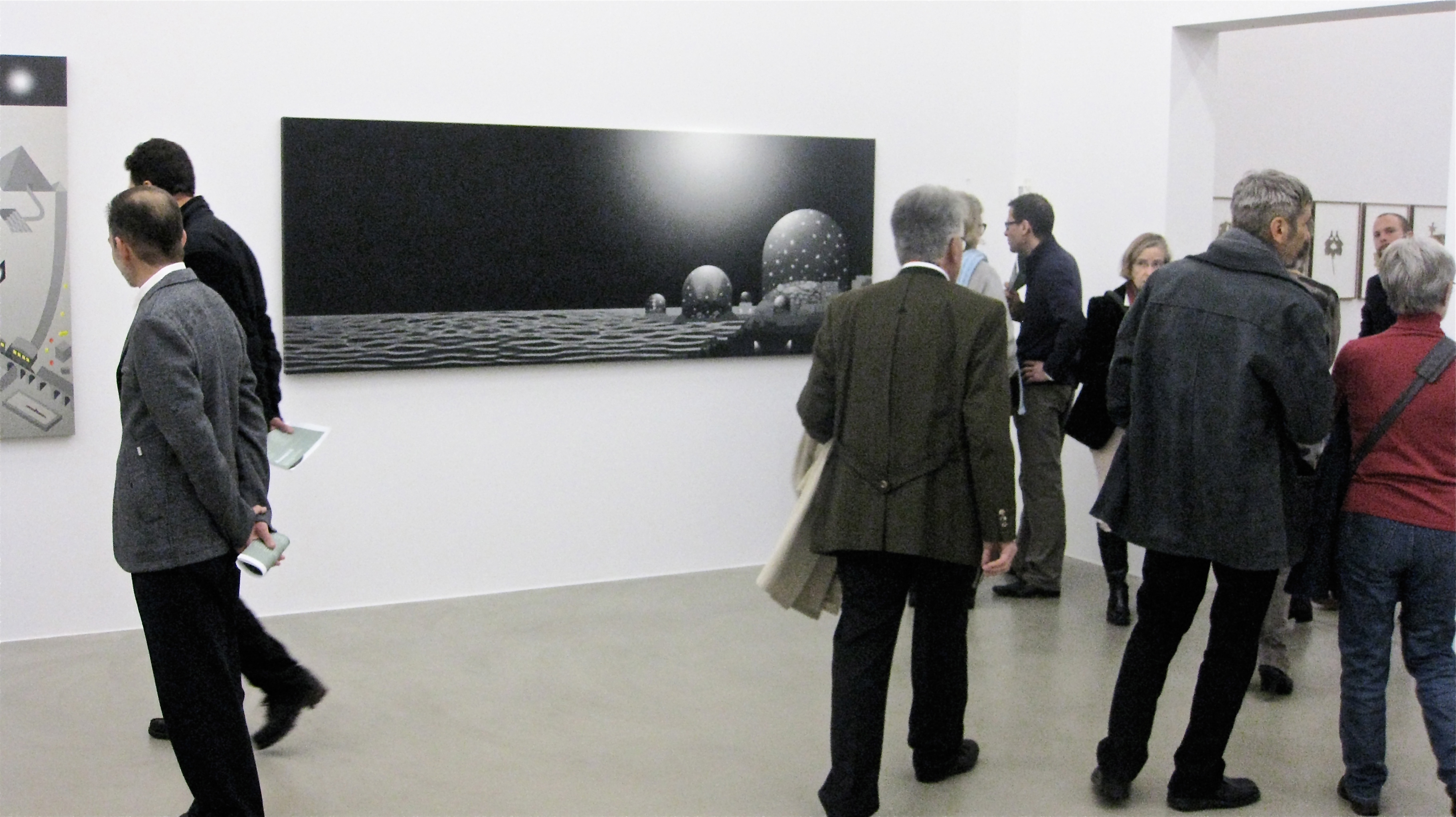
Museum of Art Aarau

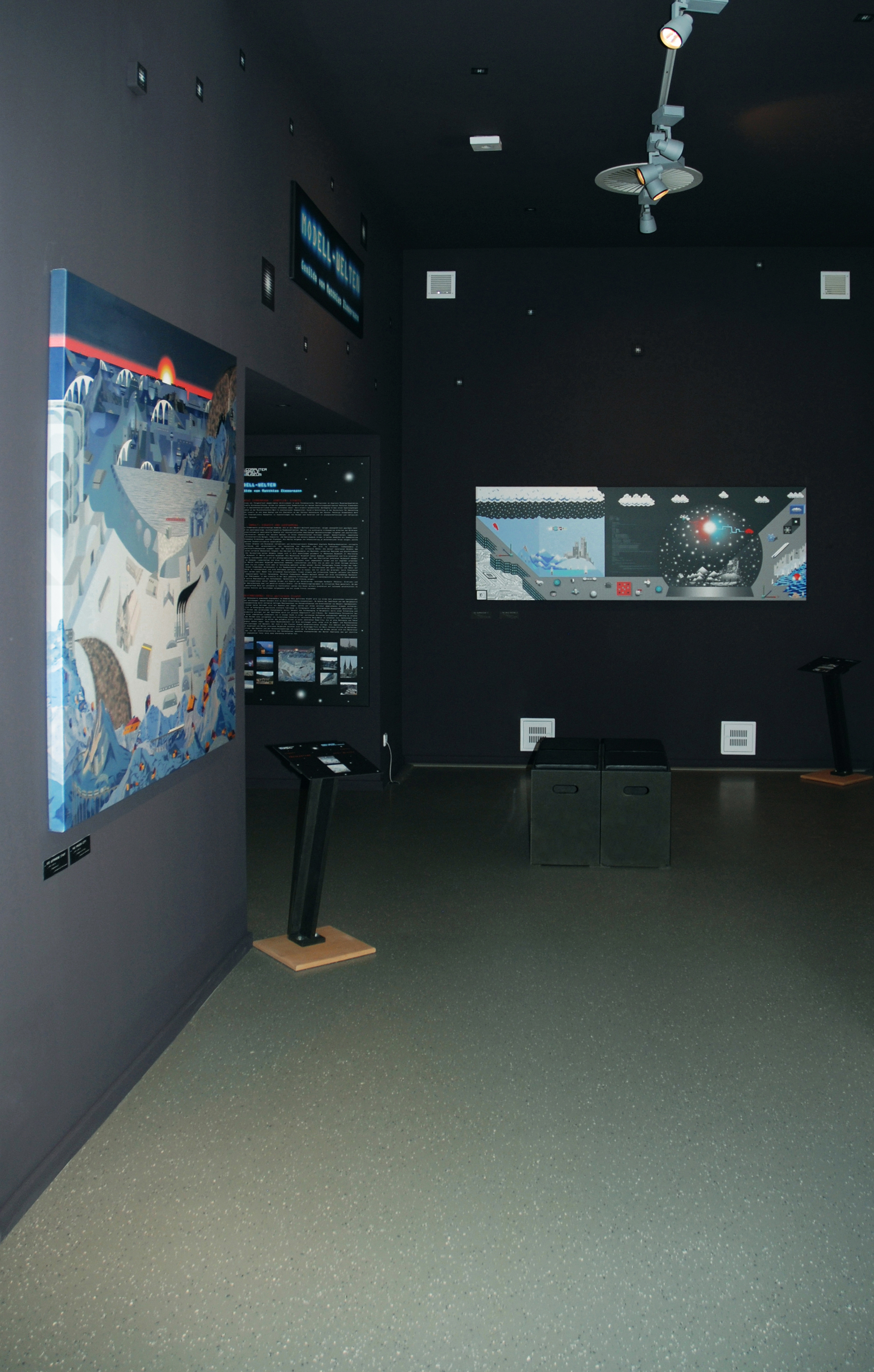
Computer Games Museum Berlin

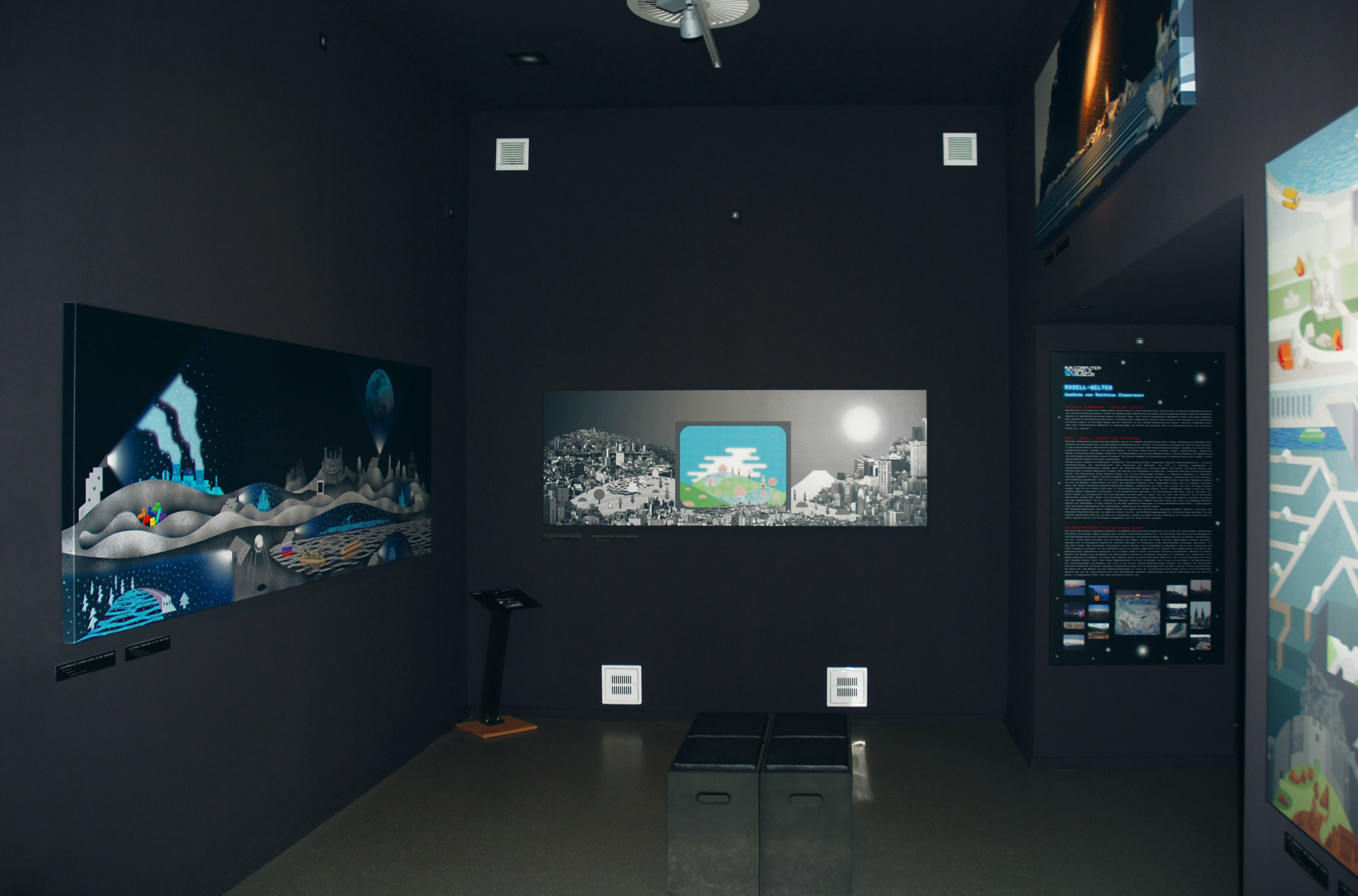
Computer Games Museum Berlin

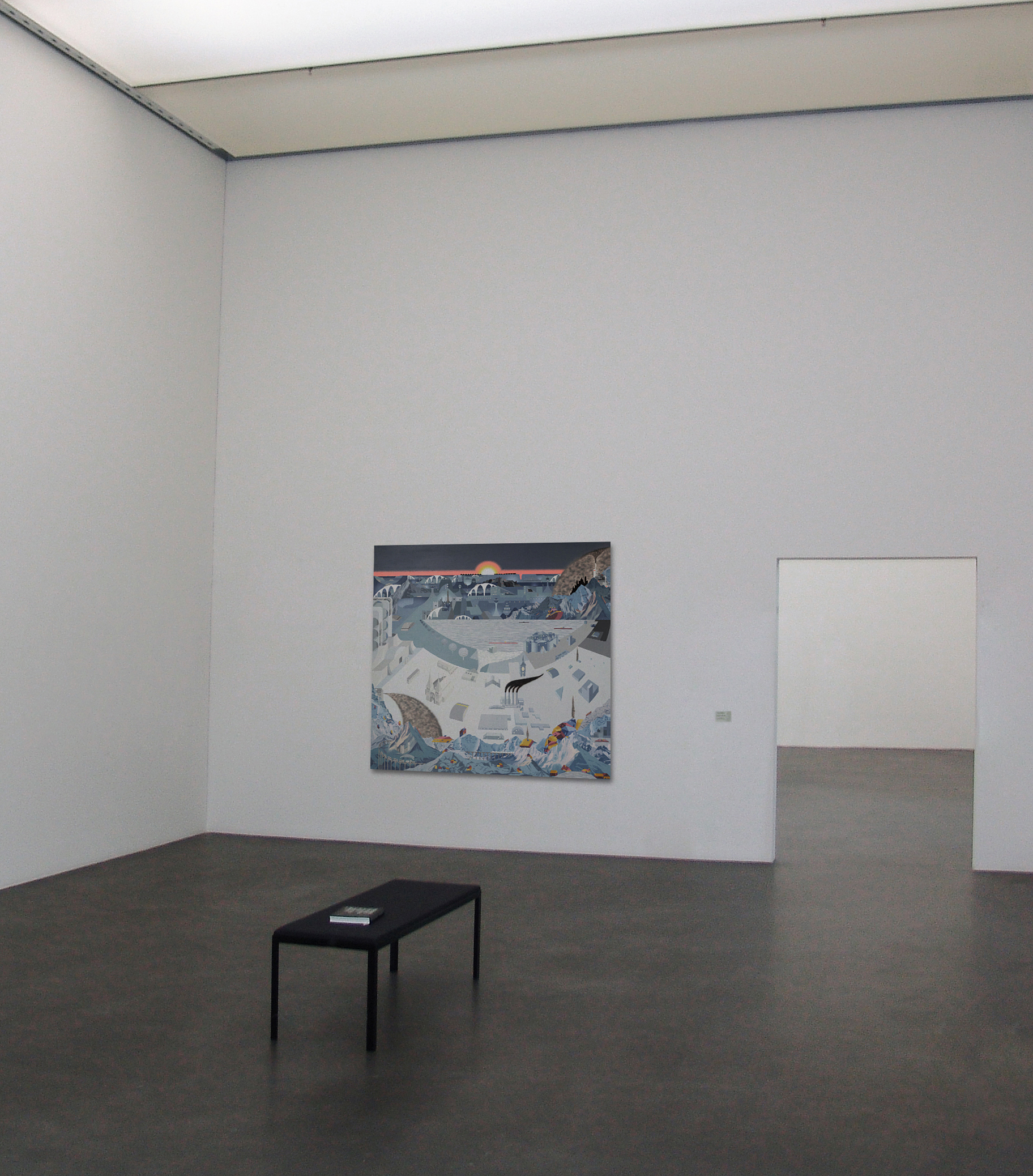
Art Museum of Lucerne

== Literature ==
- Natascha Adamowsky (ed.): Digital Modernity. The Model Worlds by Matthias Zimmermann. Hirmer Publishers, Munich 2018, ISBN 978-3-7774-2388-3
- Mark R. Hesslinger / Beate Reifenscheid (ed.): Reality and the Divine – From the Deutschherrenhaus to the Ludwig Museum 1216 – 2016, Ludwig Museum, Koblenz 2016, ISBN 978-3-9816878-2-8
- Christian Huberts, Sebastian Standke (Hrsg.): Between|Worlds: Atmospheres in the Computer Game. Werner Hülsbusch, Glückstadt 2014, ISBN 978-3-86488-063-6
- Dagmar Fenner (Hrsg.): What can and may art do? An ethical outline. Campus Publishers, Frankfurt a. M. 2013, ISBN 978-3-59339-871-6

== Publications about Matthias A. K. Zimmermann (selection) ==
- ARD (broadcaster)/Reload, Television publication: Video game art, 7 October 2014
- University of Heidelberg/Publicationsplattform Art History, René Stettler: Various scientific essays.
- Berliner Gazette – Culture, Politics and Digital: Various authors.
- Language at Play – Scientific magazine, Christian Huberts: The re-medialization of procedural atmosphere into static paintings
- Neue Zürcher Zeitung, Gerhard Mack: Digital world – painters use virtual space
- Basler Zeitung, Graziella Kuhn: Pixel auf Leinwand
- Luzerner Zeitung, Urs Bugmann: A World of Extreme Artificiality
- Luzerner Zeitung, Urs Bugmann: Pictures, perfect like from the computer game
- 20 Minuten, Jan Graber: When "Mario" and "Tetris" are hanging in the museum
- Winzavod, Moscow: «Модельные миры»_Маттиас Циммерманн
- The Village, Moscow: В галерее «11.12» открывается выставка Маттиаса Циммермана
- Swiss Embassy in Moscow: Moscow. Matthias Zimmermann at Winzavod
- EA Blog for digital game culture, Martin Lorber: Game Art – Art and digital games: The space machine by Matthias A. K. Zimmermann
- GamesArt, Davis Schrapel: Miscellaneous articles
