= Martin Burckhardt =

German author and cultural theorist

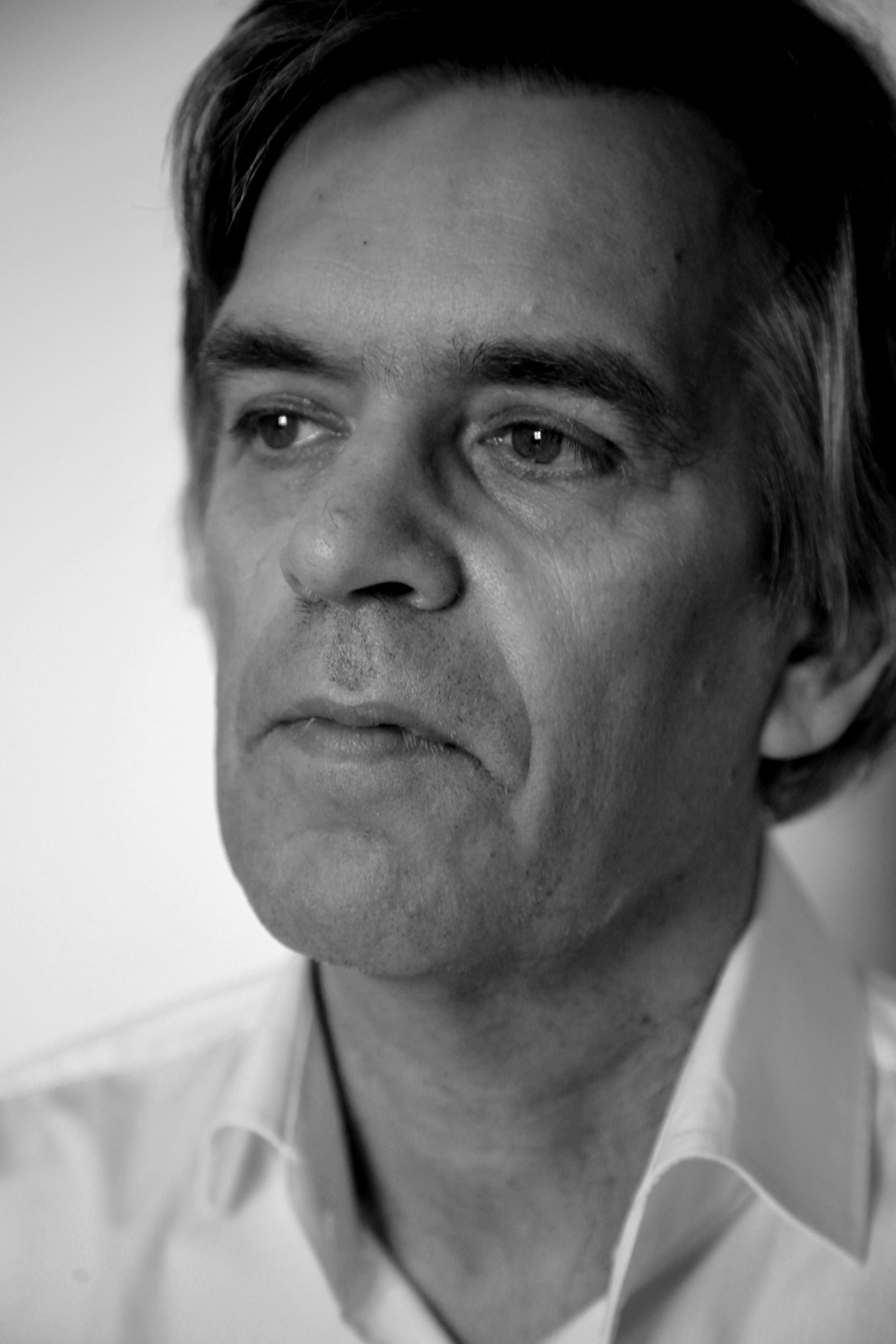
- Born: 28 July 1957 (age 69); Fulda
- Writing career
- Language: German

Martin Burckhardt (born 28 July 1957 in Fulda) is a German author and cultural theorist. In 2011, Burckhardt released a browser game called TwinKomplex, which addresses societal topics. His first novel, Score, was published in 2015.

== Works ==
=== Books ===
- Metamorphosen von Raum und Zeit. Eine Geschichte der Wahrnehmung. Campus, Frankfurt/M. 1994, ISBN 978-3-88375-927-2.
- Vom Geist der Maschine. Eine Geschichte der kultureller Umbrüche. Campus, Frankfurt/M. 1999, ISBN 978-3-593-36275-5.
- Brandlhuber. Eine Fiktion. König, Köln 2005, ISBN 978-3-88375-927-2.
- Die Scham der Philosophen. Semele, Berlin 2006, ISBN 978-3-938869-01-7.
- 68. Die Geschichte einer Kulturrevolution. Semele, Berlin 2007, ISBN 978-3-938869-15-4.
- Eine kleine Geschichte der großen Gedanken. Wie die Philosophie die Welt erfand. DuMont, Köln 2008, ISBN 978-3-8321-8083-6.
- Digitale Renaissance. Manifest für eine neue Welt. Metrolit, Berlin 2014, ISBN 978-3-8493-0330-3. Website zum Buch
- Wie die Philosophie unsere Welt erfand. DuMont, Köln 2014, ISBN 978-3-8321-6307-5.
- Alles und Nichts. Ein Pandämonium digitaler Weltvernichtung. (with Dirk Höfer) Matthes & Seitz, Berlin 2015, ISBN 978-3-95757-096-3.
- Score. Wir schaffen das Paradies auf Erden. Roman. Knaus, München 2015, ISBN 978-3-8135-0643-3.
- Todo y nada. Un pandemonio de la destrucción del mundo. Herder editorial, Barcelona 2017.
- Philosophie der Maschine. Matthes & Seitz, Berlin 2017, ISBN 978-3-95757-476-3.
- All and Nothing. A digital Apocalypse (with Dirk Höfer). MIT Press, 2017, ISBN 978-0-262-34273-5
- Psychology of the Machine Series: Über dem Luftmeer. Matthes & Seitz, Berlin 2023, ISBN 978-3-7518-0398-4

=== Selected articles & essays ===
- 2022. Digital Metaphysics. Ex nihilo, 28 December 2022 [English translation of Digitale Metaphysiks], Merkur (vol. 42) April 1988]
- 2023. In the Working Memory. Ex nihilo, 10 May 2023 [English translation of Im Arbeitsspeicher – Zur Rationalisierung geistiger Arbeit. In: König, H., von Greiff, B., Schauer, H. (eds) Sozialphilosophie der industriellen Arbeit. LEVIATHAN Zeitschrift für Sozialwissenschaft, vol 11. VS Verlag für Sozialwissenschaften, Wiesbaden, January 1990.
- 2023. The Monster and its Telematic Guillotine. Ex nihilo, 22 June 2023 [English translation of Das Monster und seine telematische Guillotine. In: Burckhardt, M. – 68. Die Geschichte einer Kulturrevolution, Berlin, 2009.]
- 2023. Emergence of the Psychotope. Ex nihilo, 28 August 2023 [English translation of Die Universale Maschine], Merkur (vol. 44) November 1990]

=== Lectures ===
- 2023. From the Abuse Value. Ex nihilo, 24 May 2023 [English translation of Zeit ist Geld ist wird Zeit, a lecture given at a symposium on Threshold Times at the Protestant Academy in Tutzing on 1 October 1999.]

=== Interviews ===
- 2023. Above the Sea of Air. Ex nihilo
