= Economy and Society (journal) =

Academic journal

- Discipline: Economics, political science
- Language: English
- Edited by: Paul Langley

Publication details
- History: 1971–present
- Publisher: Routledge
- Frequency: Quarterly
- Impact factor: 4.182 (2021)

Standard abbreviations
- ISO 4: Econ. Soc.

Indexing
- ISSN: 0308-5147 (print); 1469-5766 (web)

Links
- Journal homepage; Online access; Online archive

Economy and Society is a quarterly peer-reviewed academic journal of theory and politics. It was established in 1971 and is published by Routledge. As of 2022, its managing editor is Paul Langley (Durham University).

== Abstracting and indexing ==
The journal is abstracted and indexed in the Social Sciences Citation Index and Scopus. According to the Journal Citation Reports, the journal has a 2021 impact factor of 4.182.
