= Alexander García Düttmann =

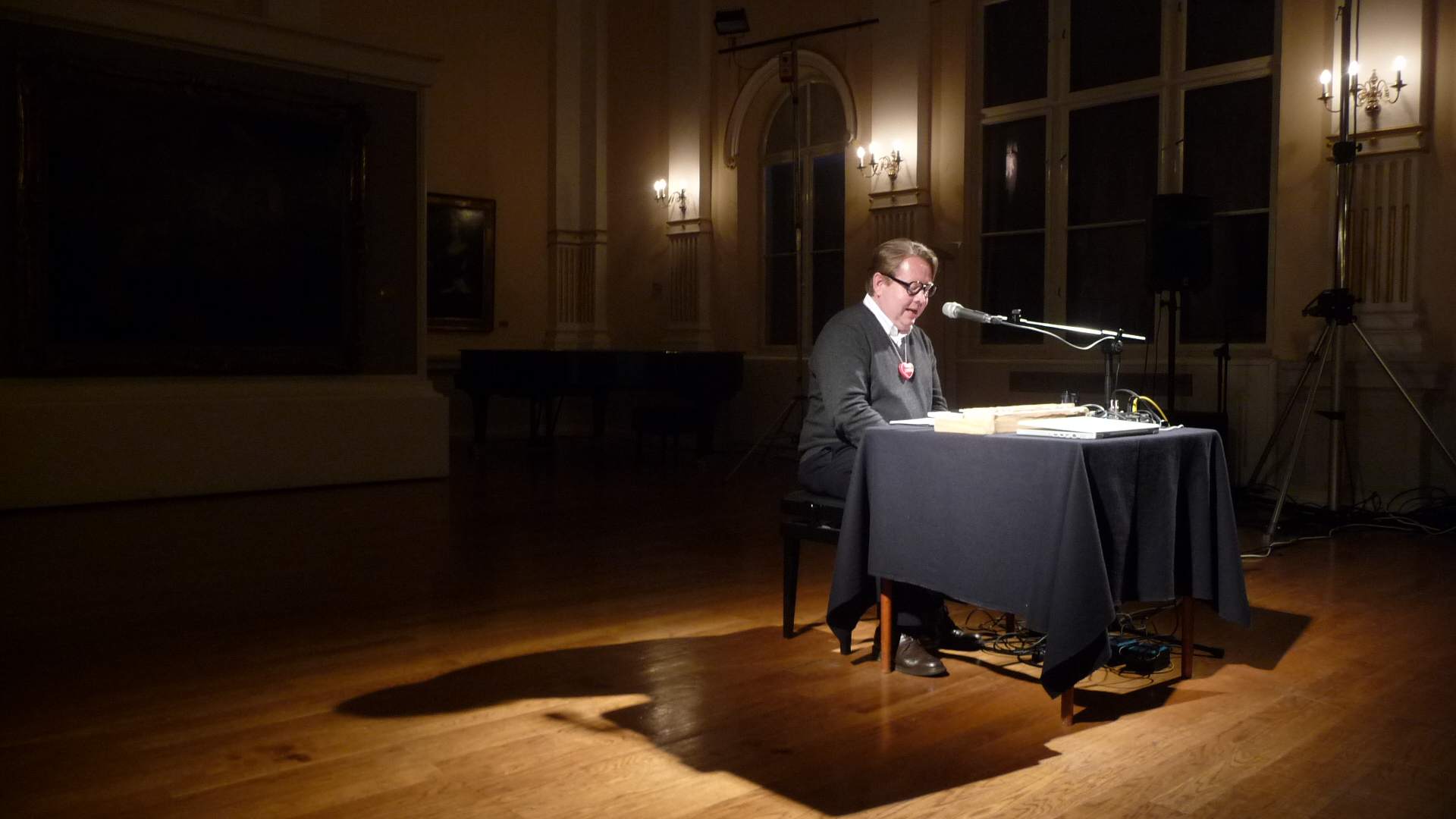
Alexander García Düttmann's lecture in the Mimara Museum, 25th Music Biennale Zagreb, April 2009

Alexander García Düttmann (born 1961 in Barcelona) studied Philosophy in Frankfurt as a student of Alfred Schmidt and in Paris as a student of Jacques Derrida.

== Career ==
After obtaining his PhD from Frankfurt, he spent two years at Stanford University as a Mellon Fellow. His first academic position in the UK was a lecturership in Philosophy at Essex University. Currently he is professor of Aesthetics and Art Theory at the Berlin University of the Arts. He has taught at Monash University, Melbourne; at Middlesex University, where he was professor of Philosophy for seven years; at New York University, where he was a visiting professor in the autumn term of 1999; and at Goldsmiths, University of London, where he taught Philosophy and Visual Culture.

== Work ==
Düttmann has published a number of authored books, many of which have been translated into several languages (English, Italian, Croatian, Japanese). His research in the past few years has been focused on the philosophical problem of deconstruction, the concept of exaggeration in philosophy, Theodor Adorno’s moral philosophy and the work of Italian filmmaker Luchino Visconti. Yet Visconti turns out to be Düttmann's pretext rather than subject, according to Frankfurter Allgemeine Zeitung reviewer Bert Rebhandl: "This is the book's real flaw: We never learn why García Düttmann talks about Visconti at all."

Currently, Düttmann deals with the question of participation in art and politics; he next will investigate the question of the contemporary in art, the relationship between photography and philosophy and the question of immortality in contemporary philosophy.

On more than one occasion, he has collaborated with artists. In 2004 the chamber opera Liebeslied / My Suicides, for which he wrote the libretto, and which featured music by Paul Clark and photographs by Rut Blees Luxemburg, opened at the Institute of Contemporary Arts (ICA) in London.

== Publications (selection) ==
- 1989: "La parole donnée", Paris: Galilée
- 1991: "Das Gedächtnis des Denkens: Versuch über Heidegger und Adorno", Frankfurt a.M.: Suhrkamp
- 1993: "Uneins mit Aids", Frankfurt a.M.: Suhrkamp
- 1997: "Zwischen den Kulturen", Frankfurt a.M.: Suhrkamp
- 1999: "Freunde und Feinde", Wien: Turia&Kant
- 2000: "Kunstende: Drei ästhetische Studien", Frankfurt a.M.: Suhrkamp
- 2004: "Philosophie der Übertreibung", Frankfurt a.M.: Suhrkamp
- 2004: "So ist es: Ein philosophischer Kommentar zu Adornos ’Minima Moralia’", Frankfurt a.M.: Suhrkamp
- 2005: "Verwisch die Spuren", Zürich/Berlin: diaphanes
- 2006: "Visconti: Einsichten in Fleisch und Blut", Berlin: Kulturverlag Kadmos
- 2008: "Derrida und ich. Das Problem der Dekonstruktion", Bielefeld: transcript
- 2011: "Teilnahme: Bewußtsein des Scheins": Konstanz: Konstanz University Press
- 2012: "Naive Kunst: Ein Versuch über das Glück", Berlin: August Verlag
- 2015: "Was weiß Kunst?: Für eine Ästhetik des Widerstands", Konstanz: Konstanz University Press
