= Thomas Khurana =

German philosopher (born 1975)

- Born: 1975 (age 50–51)

Academic background
- Education: Paderborn University (PhD)
- Thesis: Sinn und Gedächtnis: die Zeitlichkeit des Sinns und die Figuren ihrer Reflexion (2007)

Academic work
- Institutions: University of Potsdam

Thomas Khurana (born 1975) is a German philosopher. Since 2020, he has held the position of Chair of Philosophical Anthropology and Philosophy of Mind in the Department of Philosophy at the University of Potsdam. He is also currently the director of the Center for Post-Kantian Philosophy.

== Life ==
Thomas Khurana studied psychology, philosophy, sociology, and comparative literature at Bielefeld University and the Free University of Berlin. After receiving a PhD from Paderborn University in 2007, he was an assistant professor at the Department of Philosophy and the scientific coordinator of the doctoral program Forms of Life and the Know How of Living at the University of Potsdam from 2005 to 2009. From 2009 to 2014, he was an assistant professor at the Cluster of Excellence Normative Orders at Goethe University Frankfurt am Main. After holding positions at the University of Leipzig and Goethe University Frankfurt am Main, Khurana joined the School of Philosophy at the University of Essex, where he co-directed an EU project on "The Comedy of Political Philosophy.” From 2017 to 2020, he was a DFG Heisenberg Fellow at the Department of Philosophy at Yale University.

Khurana was also Heuss Visiting Lecturer at the New School for Social Research (2009), Humboldt Fellow at the Committee on Social Thought at the University of Chicago (2010–11), and Max Kade Visiting Professor at Yale University (2021). Khurana is director of the Center for Post-Kantian Philosophy and an Associate of the Research Network Critical Theory in Berlin.

== Research interests ==
Khurana characterizes himself as a post-Kantian philosopher “in the double sense that it would be difficult to articulate my questions without using Kantian ways of putting the problem, and equally hard to formulate my responses without going beyond what might seem acceptable for a good Kantian.” His areas of specialization are Kant and Hegel; post-Kantian European philosophy; social philosophy; ethics and aesthetics; philosophical anthropology; critical theory; psychoanalysis. His current research projects concern the art of second nature; self-knowledge and self-objectification; the sociality of the human life-form; the philosophy of the anthropocene.

== Writings (selection) ==
Monographs

- Die Dispersion des Unbewussten. Freud – Lacan – Luhmann. Gießen 2002, ISBN 3-89806-124-8. (Reviewed in literaturkritik.de and Neue Züricher Zeitung)
- Sinn und Gedächtnis. Die Zeitlichkeit des Sinns und die Figuren ihrer Reflexion. München 2007, ISBN 3-7705-4519-2. (Reviewed in Deutsche Zeitschrift für Philosophie, Allgemeine Zeitschrift für Philosophie and Philosophische Rundschau)
- Das Leben der Freiheit. Form und Wirklichkeit der Autonomie. Berlin 2017, ISBN 978-3-518-29798-8.(Reviewed in Zeitschrift für philosophische Literatur as well as Universa. Recensioni di filosofia, Deutsche Zeitschrift für Philosophie, Hegel-Studien, and Hegel-Bulletin)
- The Life of Freedom in Kant and Hegel. Cambridge 2026, ISBN 978-1-009-54243-2.

Edited volumes

- Recognition and the Second Person, guest edited special issue of the European Journal of Philosophy 29:3 (2021).
- Negativität: Kunst – Recht – Politik, co-edited with D. Quadflieg, J. Rebentisch, F. Raimondi, D. Setton, Berlin 2018, ISBN 978-3-518-29867-1. (Reviewed in Zeitschrift für philosophische Literatur)
- The Freedom of Life: Hegelian Perspectives (Freiheit und Gesetz III), Berlin 2013, ISBN 978-3-941-36021-1. (Reviewed in Zeitschrift für philosophische Literatur)
- Paradoxien der Autonomie (Freiheit und Gesetz I), co-edited with C. Menke, Berlin 2011; zweite Auflage 2019, ISBN 978-3-941360-10-5.
- Latenz. 40 Annäherungen an einen Begriff, co-edited with S. Diekmann, Berlin 2007, ISBN 3-16-152398-9.
- Recognition: Historical and Philosophical Perspectives, co-edited with M. Congdon, London 2026, ISBN 978-1-032-30491-5.
