= Michèle Lowrie =

- Occupations: Andrew W. Mellon Distinguished Service Professor, Classics and the College

Academic background
- Education: Yale University (BA, 1984); Harvard University (PhD, 1990)

Academic work
- Discipline: Classics
- Institutions: University of Chicago

Michèle Lowrie is the Andrew W. Mellon Distinguished Service Professor of Classics and the college at the University of Chicago. She is a specialist in Roman literature and political thought.

== Education ==
Lowrie completed a bachelor's degree at Yale University in 1984, followed by a PhD at Harvard University in 1990. Her doctoral thesis was entitled 'Horace's Lyric Exempla' and she was supervised by Richard Tarrant.

== Career ==
Lowrie began teaching at New York University in 1990 after the completion of her doctorate, as Assistant and Associate Professor of Classics. She was awarded a Presidential Fellowship by the university while writing her first monograph, Horace's Narrative Odes.

During the period of 2000–2001, she was a member of the Institute for Advanced Study in Princeton and held the Burkhardt Fellowship from the American Council of Learned Societies. This was while she was working on Writing, Performance, and Authority in Augustan Rome (published 2009). In late 2005, she held a visiting research professorship at the Warburg-Haus in Hamburg.

She moved to the University of Chicago in 2009. She held a fellowship at the Research Center for Cultural Theory and Theory of the Political Imaginary at the University of Konstanz in 2010–11, and visited the Center for Advanced Studies at LMU Munich in 2012, 2013, 2014, and 2018 to collaborate with Barbara Vinken on a book entitled Civil War and the Collapse of the Social Bond: The Roman Tradition at the Heart of the Modern, which came out in 2022.

Lowrie was granted a Loeb Classical Library fellowship and made the Dirk Ippen Fellow for spring 2016 at the American Academy in Berlin, while working on a project entitled 'Safety, Security, and Salvation in Roman Political Thought,' which explored the Roman origins of concepts like national security or emergency and their relationships with societal values. She also gave the J.H. Gray Lectures at the University of Cambridge in 2018.

While completing her book project on security as a Roman metaphor, Lowrie was awarded a National Endowment for the Humanities Fellowship in the 2018-19 cycle, during which she also held an Institute for Advanced Study Fellowship at St. Aidan's College, Durham University in spring 2019.

== Selected publications ==
- Horace's Narrative Odes (1997). Oxford: Clarendon Press.
- Writing, Performance and Authority in Augustan Rome (2009). Oxford: Oxford University Press.
- (ed.) Oxford Readings in Classical Studies: Horace, Odes and Epodes (2009). Oxford: Oxford University Press.
- (ed., with Susanne Lüdemann), Exemplarity and Singularity: Thinking through Particulars in Philosophy, Literature and Law (2015). London: Routledge.
- Civil War and the Collapse of the Social Bond: The Roman Tradition at the Heart of the Modern, jointly authored with Barbara Vinken (2022). Cambridge: Cambridge University Press.
