= Hartmut Winkler =

- Born: Hartmut Winkler; 18 November 1953; Marburg, West Germany

Hartmut Winkler (born 1953) has been a professor of Media Studies, Media Theory and Media Arts at the University of Paderborn in Germany since April 1999. Winkler is influential in the field of digital media. His works include Switching/Zapping (1991), Film Theory, Der Filmische Raum und der Zuschauer (1992) and Computers and Media Theory, Docuverse (1997). Another one of his works is "Search Engines: Metamedia on the Internet?" (1998), where he attempts to explain how a search engine is a black box, that is, he tries to show that the system of input and output many viewers use is not a legitimate neutral source. He also discusses the position of power that search engines have over their users, the structural format that search engines are based on, and how language changes the perspective of the engines. He talks about how users do not actually understand how a search engine works and how it is structured, yet we make assumptions about its workings, not truly caring how or why it does what it does, as long as it delivers the information we seek.

== Works ==
- Basiswissen Medien Book published by Winkler in 2008.
- "Docuverse" Book published by Winkler in 1997.
- "Switching - Zapping" Book published by Winkler in 1991, translated by Jim Boekbinder.
- "Configurations Volume 10 Number 1" Includes an article by Winkler, 2002.
- "Search Engines: Metamedia on the Internet?"
