= Georg Stauth =

Georg Stauth (born 28 August 1942) is a German sociologist of Islam. In his works he applies perspectives derived from Weber, Nietzsche and Foucault to an empirical and historically informed “Islamwissenschaft”.

== Biography ==
Educated in Darmstadt, he went on to study ‘Islamwissenschaft’, sociology and philosophy in Frankfurt am Main and Giessen, where he took a D.Phil. His first employment as a full academic was at Alexandria University, Egypt 1969 to 1971, from where he returned to Bochum and Strasbourg. In 1974 he became a lecturer in sociology at Bielefeld where he also served a professorship (1992 to 1994). He held various fellowships in Oxford (St. Antony's), Singapore (NUS) Adelaide (Flinders) Geelong/Melbourne (Deakin) and also at universities in Egypt (Ain Shams and Cairo Univ.). He returned to Bielefeld in 1996. In 2000 he started with the University of Mainz his researches on ‘Saintly Places in Egypt’. From 2003 to 2006 he also directed an international study group at the KWI, Institute of Advanced Study in the Humanities, in Essen on ‘Islam and Modernity’. He serves at the Advisory Board of ‘Theory, Culture and Society’ (from 1984 on) and is the co-founder of the ‘Yearbook of the Sociology of Islam’ (1998-2008).

== Selected publications ==
- Die Fellachen im Nildelta, Wiesbaden: Steiner 1984
- Nietzsche's Dance, (co-authored) Oxford: Blackwell 1988
- Islam und westlicher Rationalismus, Frankfurt am Main: Campus 1994
- Authentizität und kulturelle Globalisierung, Bielefeld: transcript Verlag 1999
- Politics and Cultures of Islamization in Southeast Asia. Bielefeld: transcript 2002
- Ägyptische heilige Orte, Vols. I-III. Bielefeld: transcript 2005-2010
- Herausforderung Ägypten. Bielefeld: transcript 2010.
- Schockwellen Tahrir. Bad König: Vantage Point World-Verlag 2011.
