= Rebecca Schneider =

American academic

- Mother: Pat Schneider
- Relatives: Laurel C. Schneider and Paul Schneider (brothers)
- Awards: Guggenheim Fellowship (2021)

Academic background
- Education: New York University
- Thesis: The Explicit Body in Performance (1996)

Academic work
- Discipline: Performance studies
- Institutions: Yale University; Cornell University; Brown University

Rebecca Schneider is an American academic of performance studies. She is author of The Explicit Body in Performance (1997), Performing Remains (2011), and Theatre and History (2014), as well as co-author of Remain (2018), and she was awarded the 2019 Oscar G. Brockett Essay Prize and a 2021 Guggenheim Fellowship. She is Professor of Modern Culture and Media at Brown University.

== Biography ==
Rebecca Schneider was born into a family who was historically involved in the Atlantic slave trade and eventually moved westward into present-day Missouri, Kansas, and California. Her parents are authors Peter Schneider and Pat Schneider, and her siblings are authors Bethany Schneider, Laurel C. Schneider, and Paul Schneider. She obtained her PhD in Performance Studies from New York University in 1996; her doctoral dissertation was titled The Explicit Body in Performance.

After working as a lecturer at Yale University (1992-1995) and as a visiting professor at Dartmouth College (1995-1997), Schneider became an assistant professor at Cornell University in 1997. She moved to Brown University in 2002, and she was promoted to associate professor in 2003 and to full professor in 2009. She was chair of Brown's Department of Theatre and Performance Studies from 2007 until 2013.

Schneider specializes in performance studies. She wrote three books on performance studies: The Explicit Body in Performance (1997), Performing Remains (2011), and Theatre and History (2014). In 2018, she co-authored Remain with Ioana Jucan and Jussi Parikka. She was an editor for three TDR special issues, namely in 2012, 2015, and 2018.

Schneider won the American Society for Theatre Research's 2019 Oscar G. Brockett Essay Prize for her 2018 Theatre Journal article "That the Past May Yet Have Another Future: Gesture in the Times of Hands Up". In 2021, she was awarded a Guggenheim Fellowship in Theatre Arts and Performance Studies, to work on a book discussing "how performance is linked to the currents of oceanic history".

== Bibliography ==
- The Explicit Body in Performance (1997)
- Performing Remains (2011)
- Theatre and History (2014)
- Remain (2018; with Ioana Jucan and Jussi Parikka)
