= Jane M. Bowers =

American flautist, musicologist and feminist (1936–2022)

- Born: September 17, 1936; Minneapolis, Minnesota, United States
- Died: June 28, 2022 (aged 85); Glendale, Milwaukee, Wisconsin, United States
- Education: Wellesley College; University of California, Berkeley; Royal Conservatory of The Hague
- Occupations: Flautist, musicologist and feminist
- Employer(s): Oakland Symphony; University of North Carolina at Chapel Hill; Eastman School of Music; University of Wisconsin–Milwaukee; The New Grove Dictionary of Music and Musicians
- Organization(s): Early Music Now; International Alliance for Women in Music; American Musicological Society
- Notable work: Women Making Music: The Western Art Tradition, 1150-1950 (1986)

Jane Meredith Bowers (September 17, 1936 – June 28, 2022) was an American flautist, musicologist, educator and feminist. She is most known for editing Women Making Music: The Western Art Tradition, 1150-1950 (1986) and for her contributions to The New Grove Dictionary of Music and Musicians.

== Early life and education ==
Bowers was born on September 17, 1936, in Minneapolis, Minnesota, United States. As a child, Bowers began learning piano aged 4 and played the piano and flute during her elementary, middle school, and high school education.

Bowers studied Bachelor of Music at Wellesley College in Wellesley, Massachusetts (1958), a Master of Music History at the University of California, Berkeley (1962), and a Doctor of Philosophy in Music History at the University of California, Berkeley (1971). She studied Baroque Flute with Dutch flautist and conductor Frans Brüggen at the Royal Conservatory of The Hague in the Netherlands (1965 to 1966) and was mentored by Austrian-American feminist historian Gerda Lerner.

== Career ==
From 1962 to 1965, Bowers was the assistant principal flutist with the Oakland Symphony in Oakland, California.

Bowers worked as a flute instructor at the University of North Carolina at Chapel Hill from 1968 to 1972 and as an assistant professor of music history and musicology at the Eastman School of Music in Rochester, New York, from 1972 to 1975. In 1981, she began teaching at as a tenured associate professor of music at the University of Wisconsin, Milwaukee. Among her teaching modules was "Women Musicians and Composers in Western Europe and the United States between 1100 and the Present," one of the first course on the topic offered at an American university. In 1989, she gave a talk on "Feminist Scholarship and the Field of Musicology" at the College Music Symposium.

Bowers was the author of The French Flute School from 1700 to 1760 (1981), based on her PhD thesis. She translated French composer François Devienne’s flute treatise from the original French text in 1999.

Bowers researched European women composers with the benefit of a post-doctoral fellowship from the American Association of University Women. This led to Bowers' and Judith Tick's editorship of Women Making Music: The Western Art Tradition, 1150-1950 (1986), a "pathbreaking anthology of authoritative essays on historical women musicians." As a contributor of articles about flautists, composers, and instrument makers for the The New Grove Dictionary of Music and Musicians, Bowers suggested that Jean Hotteterre was responsible for new method of construction of the oboe.

Bowers researched the life of African-American blues singer Estelle Yancey and her husband Jimmy Yancey and wrote articles about them for the journal Black Music Research. She reflected on writing a biography of a black woman as a white writer in a chapter of the book Music and Gender (2000), edited by Pirkko Moisala and Beverley Diamond.

With director Thallis Hoyt Drake, Bowers was a founding board member in 1986 of Early Music Now in Milwaukee. Bowers was a member of the International Alliance for Women in Music (IAWM) and was the founding editor of IAWM's scholarly journal Women and Music: A Journal of Gender and Culture. She was also a member of the American Musicological Society.

== Personal life and death ==
Bowers identified as a lesbian. She came out at her 70th birthday party.

Bowers died of natural causes on June 28, 2022, at Silverado North Shore Memory Care Community in Glendale, Milwaukee, Wisconsin, United States, aged 85.
