= Aleksandar Shopov =

Ottoman historian and academic

- Born: Skopje, SFRY (now North Macedonia)
- Relatives: Aco Šopov (grandfather)

Academic background
- Education: Ss. Cyril and Methodius University; Sabancı University; Harvard University
- Thesis: Between the Pen and the Fields: Books on Farming, Changing Land Regimes, and Urban Agriculture in the Ottoman Eastern Mediterranean ca. 1500–1700 (2016)
- Doctoral advisor: Cemal Kafadar

Academic work
- Discipline: History
- Sub-discipline: Ottoman history, Environmental history, History of science
- Institutions: Binghamton University

Aleksandar Shopov (also Šopov) is a historian and assistant professor of early modern Ottoman History in the Department of History at Binghamton University, New York (SUNY). His research focuses on the history of science and technology and the environmental history of the Ottoman eastern Mediterranean between 1300 and 1700. Shopov has published in the history of science journals Isis and Osiris and co-edited the volume Toward a Global History of Soil: Sciences, Practices, and Materialities, 1300–1750 (Brill, 2025).

== Education and career ==
Aleksandar Shopov was born in Skopje, SR Macedonia, Yugoslavia, now North Macedonia. He is the grandson of Macedonian poet and WWII resistance fighter Aco Šopov.

Shopov received his BA from Ss. Cyril and Methodius University in Skopje, his MA from Sabancı University in Istanbul in 2007 and his PhD from Harvard University in 2016 in history and Middle Eastern studies. His MA thesis examined accounts of the Battle of the Maritsa of 1371 across Ottoman, Slavic, Greek and western sources and their role in later Balkan and Turkish historiographies. His PhD dissertation, Between the Pen and the Fields: Books on Farming, Changing Land Regimes, and Urban Agriculture in the Ottoman Eastern Mediterranean ca. 1500–1700, examined the relationship between Ottoman manuscript traditions on farming and the material and economic realities of agriculture as documented in archival sources, arguing that Ottoman agricultural discourse became increasingly vernacularised and oriented toward firsthand experience over the classical Arabic canon.

Shopov was involved in efforts to document and preserve the historic market gardens of Istanbul known as bostans, particularly the Yedikule gardens. His work on the gardens was covered by Yale Environment 360 and Bloomberg News, which named him among activists opposing development of the site. In 2015 Shopov co-authored a chapter on the endangered market gardens of Istanbul in Archaeology for the People: Joukowsky Institute Perspectives (Oxbow Books, 2015). In 2023, he was quoted as an expert on Ottoman urban agriculture by TRT World.

He has held fellowships at the Aga Khan Program for Islamic Architecture at Harvard University, the Max Planck Institute for the History of Science in Berlin, the Rachel Carson Center for Environment and Society at LMU Munich and the Annemarie Schimmel Kolleg at the University of Bonn. He also held the William R. Tyler Dissertation Fellowship at Dumbarton Oaks Research Library in Washington, D.C. and was a Junior Fellow at the Research Center for Anatolian Civilisations at Koç University in Istanbul.

== Research and publications ==
Shopov's research focuses on early modern Ottoman knowledge and practices related to plants and animals, examined through the intersecting lenses of environmental history and the history of science and technology. His 2019 article in Levant examined the expansion of rice farming in the Ottoman Balkans and its relationship to environmental change and the emergence of agrarian capitalism. Shopov contributed a chapter on agricultural works to Gülru Necipoğlu, Cemal Kafadar and Cornell Fleischer's Treasures of Knowledge: An Inventory of the Ottoman Palace Library (Brill, 2019). In a 2020 review in the Journal of the Ottoman and Turkish Studies Association, Konrad Hirschler of Freie Universität Berlin described Shopov's contribution as making a strong methodological case for matching extant manuscripts with the inventory. Shopov contributed a chapter on the gardens and orchards of Ottoman Istanbul to A Companion to Early Modern Istanbul (Brill, 2022). In a review essay in YILLIK: Annual of Istanbul Studies, James Grehan of Portland State University noted that Shopov's chapter argued that historians had not paid sufficient attention to the agricultural side of the urban economy, and that his findings on Ottoman courts creating legal exemptions to sustain urban agriculture contributed to recent scholarship on the flexibility of Ottoman legal practice.

A 2022 article in Isis investigated flower breeding in early modern Istanbul, analysing Ottoman practices of seed cultivation as a form of scientific knowledge. A 2025 article in Osiris examined camel hybridisation in sixteenth-century Selanik in the context of Ottoman mobility and natural knowledge. Shopov is a series editor of the Brill series Agriculture and the Making of Sciences 1100–1700: Texts, Practices, and Knowledge Transmission in Asia, alongside Dagmar Schäfer, Chun Xu and Bethany Walker. He also co-edited, with Justin Niermeier-Dohoney, the volume Toward a Global History of Soil: Sciences, Practices, and Materialities, 1300–1750, published by Brill in 2025.
