= Wolfgang Ernst (media theorist) =

German media scholar and historian

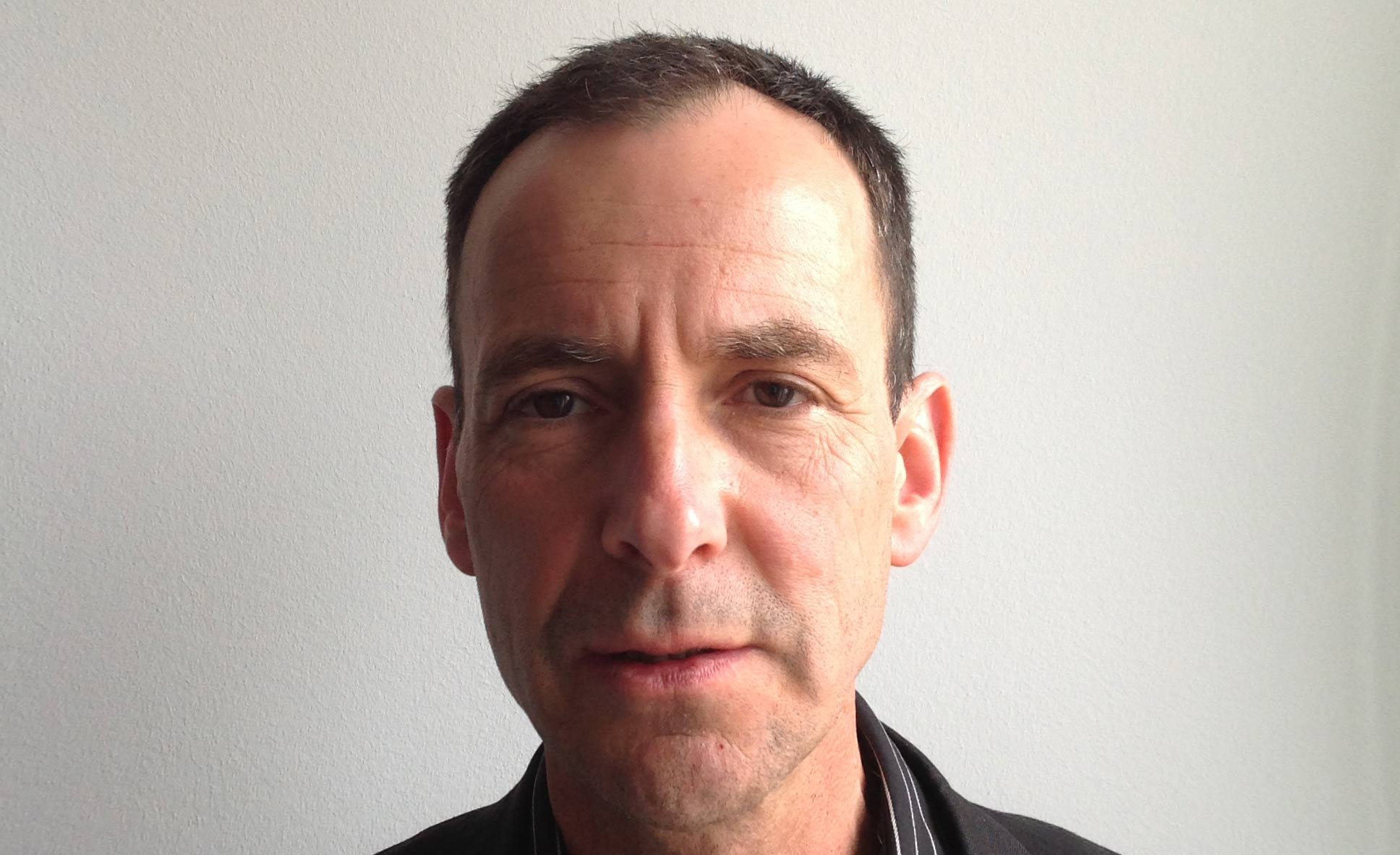
- Wolfgang Ernst in 2013
- Education: University of Cologne; University of London; Ruhr University Bochum
- Scientific career
- Fields: Media theory
- Workplaces: Humboldt University of Berlin

Wolfgang Ernst (born 1959) is a German media theorist. He is Professor for Media Theories at Humboldt University of Berlin and a major exponent of media archaeology as a method of scholarly inquiry.

== Biography ==
Ernst studied history, archaeology and classics at the University of Cologne, University of London, and Ruhr University Bochum. He wrote his dissertation on the aesthetic history of collections and work as an assistant at the Studienstiftung. He held positions in Leipzig, Kassel, Rome, Cologne, Weimar, Bochum, Paderborn and Berlin. Wolfgang Ernst collaborated with bootlab Berlin and developed alternative formats of theory with Till Nikolaus von Heiseler.

In 2001, he finished his habilitation about institutions of remembrance and memory in the 19th and 20th centuries. Since April 2003, he is a full professor at Humboldt University of Berlin. 2015-2017 Wolfgang Ernst has held the position as director of the Department for Musicology and Media Studies at Humboldt University of Berlin.

Ernst is internationally known as a theorist of archives and the media practice of archiving and as an exponent of media archaeology. His latest work focuses on media-time, time-critical media, and the "sonic" as a form that connects technical and musical practices. He is the founder of a unique operative collection of technical media at Humboldt University Berlin — the "media archaeological fund".

== Selected writings in German ==
- Das Rumoren der Archive. Ordnung aus Unordnung (ISBN 3-88396-176-0), Merve, Berlin 2002
- Im Namen von Geschichte. Sammeln – Speichern – (Er-)Zählen (ISBN 3-7705-3832-3, Habilitationsschrift HU Berlin), Wilhelm Fink, München 2003
- Das Gesetz des Gedächtnisses. Medien und Archive am Ende (des 20. Jahrhunderts) (ISBN 3-86599-016-9), Kulturverlag Kadmos, Berlin 2007
- Doppelband Gleichursprünglichkeit. Zeitwesen und Zeitgegebenheit technischer Medien (ISBN 3865991440) und Chronopoetik. Zeitweisen und Zeitgaben technischer Medien (ISBN 3865991432), Kulturverlag Kadmos, Berlin, 2013
- Signale aus der Vergangenheit. Eine kleine Geschichtskritik (ISBN 978-3-7705-5477-5), Wilhelm Fink, Berlin 2013
- Im Medium erklingt die Zeit. Technologische Tempor(e)alitäten und das Sonische als ihre privilegierte Erkenntnisform (ISBN 978-3-86599-274-1), Kulturverlag Kadmos, Berlin 2015

== Selected writings in English ==
- Digital Memory and the Archive., (doi:10.5749/minnesota/9780816677665.001.0001, ISBN 978-0-8166-7766-5, edited and with an introduction by Jussi Parikka) University of Minnesota Press, Minneapolis, London 2013
- Stirrings in the Archive. Order from Disorder, (ISBN 978-1-4422-5395-7, translation of Das Rumoren der Archive) Rowman & Littlefield, Lanham, Boulder, New York, London 2015
- Chronopoetics. The Temporal Being and Operativity of technological Media, (ISBN 978-1-7834-8570-3, selection and translation of texts taken from Gleichursprünglichkeit. Zeitwesen und Zeitgegebenheit technischer Medien and Chronopoetik. Zeitweisen und Zeitgaben technischer Medien) Rowman & Littlefield, Lanham, Boulder, New York, London 2016
- Sonic Time Machines. Explicit Sound, Sirenic Voices, and Implicit Sonicity, (ISBN 978-90-8964-949-2) Amsterdam University Press, Amsterdam 2016
- The Delayed Present: Media-Induced Tempor(e)alities & Techno-traumatic Irritations of the Contemporary, (ISBN 978-3-95679-340-0) Sternberg Press, Berlin 2017
