= Max Planck Institute for the History of Science =

Research institute

- Max-Planck-Institut für Wissenschaftsgeschichte
- Abbreviation: MPIWG
- Formation: March 1994; 32 years ago
- Type: Scientific research institute
- Location: Dahlem, Berlin, Germany
- Executive director: Etienne Benson
- Directors: Etienne Benson and Dagmar Schäfer
- Key people: Lorraine Daston and Jürgen Renn, founding directors
- Parent organization: Max Planck Society
- Website: www.mpiwg-berlin.mpg.de

The Max Planck Institute for the History of Science (German: Max-Planck-Institut für Wissenschaftsgeschichte, MPIWG) is a research institute in Berlin, Germany, founded in 1994. It is one of more than 80 institutes of the Max Planck Society and is dedicated to the study of scientific thinking and practice as historical phenomena.

Research at the MPIWG examines how knowledge is produced, circulated, and transformed across different periods and regions. Its work focuses on the practices, institutions, and infrastructures through which scientific, technological, and medical knowledge take shape, and on how these forms of knowledge interact with social, political, and material orders.

The Institute currently comprises two departments: Knowledge Systems and Collective Life, directed by Etienne Benson, and Artifacts, Action, Knowledge, directed by Dagmar Schäfer. It also hosts research groups, a Digital Humanities team, the International Max Planck Research School “Knowledge and Its Resources: Historical Reciprocities,” doctoral researchers, and international research and teaching cooperations.

== Organization and Research ==
The MPIWG consists of two departments and several independent research groups. The Institute's two departments are:

- "Knowledge Systems and Collective Life," directed by Etienne Benson
- "Artifacts, Action, Knowledge," directed by Dagmar Schäfer

Hans-Jörg Rheinberger, who headed the department "Experimental Systems & Spaces of Knowledge" from 1994 to 2014, and Lorraine Daston, who headed the department "Ideals & Practices of Rationality" from 1995 to 2019, both remain at the MPIWG as emeriti. Jürgen Renn headed the department "Structural Changes in Systems of Knowledge" from 1994 to 2023.

The Institute's current research groups are:

- "Astral Sciences in Trans-Regional Asia (ASTRA)," led by Anuj Misra.
- "China in the Global System of Science," led by Anna L. Ahlers
- "Experience in the Premodern Sciences of Soul & Body ca. 800–1650," led by Katja Krause

The Institute also hosts a doctoral school, the International Max Planck Research School "Knowledge and Its Resources: Historical Reciprocities."

The MPIWG library holds extensive print and digital collections of primary and secondary sources, as well as a rare books collection. Its collections and services are tailored to the Institute’s research needs, and Institute scholars have round-the-clock access to the library’s print and digital holdings and study spaces.

In addition, the Institute's structure includes:

- Digital Humanities Team
- Research Communications and Management Team
- Administration and IT Support

The Institute also maintains research, teaching, and institutional cooperations with partners worldwide. These include:

- Max Planck–NTU Singapore Centre for Biocultural Worlding (CBCW): A joint initiative of the MPIWG and the Nanyang Technological University Centre for Contemporary Art Singapore, established in April 2026. The Centre brings together history of science, artistic and curatorial practice, legal inquiry, and diverse knowledge traditions to examine the interdependence of biological and cultural diversity and to develop collaborative approaches to more equitable biocultural futures.
- EduTrack: Tracking Education Pathways and Social Policies: A six-year interdisciplinary collaboration between the Max Planck Institute for Demographic Research, the MPIWG, and the Max Planck Institute for Political and Social Science, funded by the Max Planck Society and led by Population Europe. Within EduTrack, the MPIWG team examines how migration, social mobility, and digital access shape knowledge exchange between Asia and Europe, focusing on migratory expertise, practices of knowledge transmission, and the digital accessibility of cultural heritage and historical materials.

== Affiliated Scholars ==
The MPIWG has hosted numerous scholars as directors, research group leaders, fellows, visiting researchers, and affiliated researchers. Scholars associated with the Institute include:

- Pamela H. Smith
- Anne Gerritsen
- Hannah Landecker
- Soraya de Chadarevian
- Wolfgang Lefèvre
- David M. Robinson
- Justin K. Stearns
- Bethany J. Walker
- Horst Kant
- Gadi Algazi
- David Sepkoski
- Edna Bonhomme
- Aleksandar Shopov

== Journalists in Residence ==
The institute has a Journalist-in-Residence program.
