= Pat Schneider =

American writer (1934–2020)

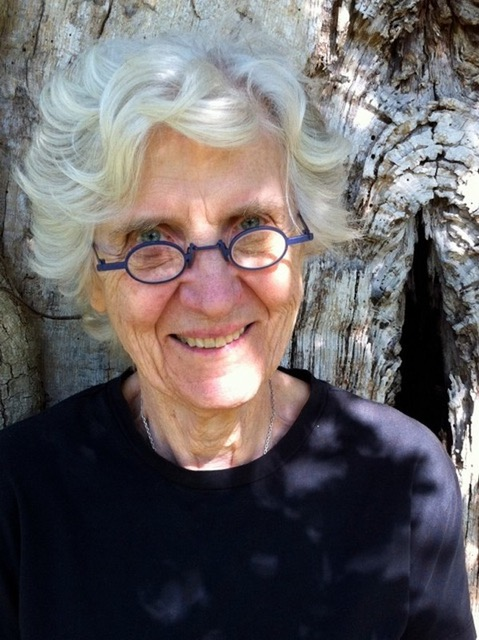
- Pat Schneider
- Born: 1 June 1934; Ava, Missouri, U.S.
- Died: August 10, 2020 (aged 86); Amherst, Massachusetts, U.S.
- Occupations: Poet, writer, editor, writing teacher
- Website: www.patschneider.com

Pat Schneider (June 1, 1934 – August 10, 2020) was an American writer, poet, writing teacher and editor.

== Biography ==
Schneider was born in Ava, Missouri in 1934. She was educated at Central Methodist College in Missouri, and earned her MA from the Pacific School of Religion in Berkeley, California. In 1979 she became a graduate of the MFA Program for Poets & Writers at the University of Massachusetts Amherst.

Schneider lived in Amherst, Massachusetts. She was the founder/director of Amherst Writers & Artists and editor of Amherst Writers & Artists Press, which has published forty-two books of poetry and the national literary journal, Peregrine. Schneider has been adjunct faculty member of the Graduate Theological Union in Berkeley, California. She has led creative writing workshops at the University of Massachusetts, Smith College, Limavadi College (Northern Ireland) and the University of Connecticut. She has taught in Ireland, in Japan, and at the Graduate Theological Union in California, where she has also been playwright in residence and led annual and bi-annual workshops at the Pacific School of Religion. She has also led workshops in Smith College's School for Social Work and for residents of public housing in Chicopee, Massachusetts.

An annual poetry contest, the Pat Schneider Poetry Contest, was established in her honor by Amherst Writers and Artists in 2011. Schneider had four children, all of them published authors: Rebecca Schneider, Laurel Schneider, Paul Schneider and Bethany Schneider. Her husband, Peter Schneider, a published poet in his own right, died in December 2020 at the age of 89.

Schneider's published works are archived at the Sophia Smith Collection, Smith College, Northampton, Massachusetts, and her personal papers will be collected there as well.

== Publications and awards ==
=== Poetry ===
Schneider has published five books of poetry: Another River: New and Selected Poems (2005) The Patience of Ordinary Things (2003) Olive Street Transfer (1999) Long Way Home (1993) White River Junction (1987).

Her poetry has been published widely in literary journals and magazines, including Sewanee Review, Minnesota Review, Ms. Magazine, and Negative Capability. Her poems have been featured on The Writer's Almanac sixteen times.

It is a kind of love, is it not?
How the cup holds the tea,
How the chair stands sturdy and foursquare,
How the floor receives the bottoms of shoes
Or toes. How soles of feet know
Where they’re supposed to be.
I’ve been thinking about the patience
Of ordinary things, how clothes
Wait respectfully in closets
And soap dries quietly in the dish,
And towels drink the wet
From the skin of the back.
And the lovely repetition of stairs.
And what is more generous than a window?

— From "The Patience of Ordinary Things"
The Patience of Ordinary Things - 2003

=== Nonfiction books ===
How The Light Gets In, Writing As a Spiritual Practice, Oxford University Press, New York NY, 2013"

Writing Alone and With Others, Oxford University Press, New York, 2003.

Wake Up Laughing: A Spiritual Autobiography, Negative Capability Press, Mobile, Alabama, 1997. "Schneider’s honesty and courage in recounting her journey encourages readers to boldly examine unexpected stops and turns in their own lives, a heady task for any book.”

In Our Own Voices: Writing by Women in Low-Income Housing. (Editor, Introduction and Afterward) Published by Amherst Writers & Artists Press, Amherst, MA, 1989. Second edition, 1995.

The Writer as an Artist: A New Approach to Writing Alone and With Others. Lowell House, Los Angeles, CA, Hard cover,1993. Paperback, 1994.

=== Produced and published plays ===
Fourteen of her plays have been produced, nine published. There are more than 300 recorded productions of her plays in this country and in Europe, including these titles:

After the Applebox, From Valley Playwrights Theatre, Playwright's Press, Vol. II, 1986, Amherst, MA. Commissioned by Cooper Community Center, Roxbury, Massachusetts. Premier production in Boston, Massachusetts, subsequent productions on Cape Cod Massachusetts (Fisherman's Players); in San Anselmo, California (Festival Theater); Northampton, Massachusetts (directed and acted by Smith College Theater Department Faculty at East Street Theater, Hadley, MA); New London, Connecticut (Connecticut College Theater Department); First production, 1989.

A Question of Place, From Valley Playwrights Theatre Playwright's Press, 1986, Vol. I. Commissioned by Historic Deerfield, Inc., Deerfield, Massachusetts, 1983. Premier performances July l-4, 1983. Produced again, seven performances, in 1984.

Crossroad to Bethlehem: A Christmas Celebration. Boston: Baker's Plays 1970. Musical play. Music and lyrics published separately. Composer: A.L. Born. Seventy- one productions reported to date by the publisher.

=== Libretti ===
Schneider is an alumnus of the BMI Lehman Engel Musical Theater Workshop. Her libretti have been recorded by the Louisville Symphony and performed by Robert Shaw and the Atlanta Symphony in Boston's Symphony Hall and in Carnegie Hall, New York City. Published and recorded libretti include:

The Lament of Michal. Commissioned and recorded by the Louisville Symphony Orchestra. Golden Edition series: Stereo LS 704. Composer: Philip Rhodes. Performed by Robert Shaw and the Atlanta Symphony Orchestra in Atlanta, Boston, and Carnegie Hall. Commissioned 1970; Recorded and performed in Carnegie Hall 1980.

My Holy Mountain: An Oratorio. Commissioned by the New World Choir, a 40 voice all Black choir, Newton, MA. Composer: Florence Clark Turner. More than 50 performances in New England. 1971

I Have a Dream: A Black History Oratorio. 1970. Commissioned by the New World Choir, a 40 voice all Black choir. Recorded by Soundtrack Records. Widely produced by the New World Choir throughout New England including television production and more than 100 performances at community centers and universities. Composer: Florence Clark Turner.

=== Awards ===
She has been the recipient of literary prizes, and grants from the Danforth Foundation, the Massachusetts Artists Fellowship Awards, the Massachusetts Cultural Council, and the Community Foundation of Western Massachusetts.

== AWA writing workshops ==
Schneider began to develop the AWA method for teaching writing in workshops and other groups in 1979. Working with a community of writers in Amherst, Massachusetts, she explored ways to conduct a writing class/workshop that would honor the "primary voice," encouraging students to trust what the writer John Edgar Wideman has called "the language of home."

In 1985, Schneider offered workshops to women living in public housing in Chicopee, Massachusetts. Schneider chose to develop the workshop for women in public housing because she believes "there is no difference between the rich and the poor in this: writing is art, and our own stories are the stuff of which our freedom is made, our self esteem, our power."

In 1990 Schneider's workshops "became so popular... [Schneider] had to encourage some of her students to break away and start their own groups using her techniques. Beginning in 2004, Schneider began training other writers to become workshop leaders.
