= Erkki Huhtamo =

Finnish media historian and theorist

Erkki Huhtamo (born 1958) is a media archaeologist, exhibition curator, and professor at the University of California, Los Angeles, in the Departments of Design Media Arts and Film, Television, and Digital Media.

== Research ==
Huhtamo was born in Helsinki, Finland, and has a PhD in cultural history from the University of Turku. Before moving to Los Angeles in 1999 to teach at the University of California, Los Angeles, Huhtamo had been a professor of media studies at the University of Lapland, Rovaniemi, Finland (1994–1996), and worked as an adjunct professor at the University of Art and Design (UIAH, Helsinki, now part of Aalto University). Huhtamo published extensively in Finnish, most notably Virtuaalisuuden arkeologia ("The Archaeology of Virtuality," The University of Lapland Press, 1995) and Elävän kuvan arkeologia ("The Archaeology of the Moving Image," YLE, Finnish Broadcasting Company Publishing, 1996).

These books signaled Huhtamo's entry into the field of media archaeology, which was only beginning to define its identity and which has characterized his research ever since. Since the mid-1990s, Huhtamo has written his research in English. It has covered a wide range of issues related with media culture and the technological arts, including interactive media, simulator entertainments, the genealogy of the screen, "peep media" (a notion he has coined), stereoscopic art and media in public spaces. His work has often been aimed to excavate, resurrect and analyze neglected and forgotten media. One of its guiding lines is the combination of topos theory with media archaeology. Influenced by the pioneering work of Ernst Robert Curtius (1886–1956), Huhtamo considers "topoi" as formulas that traverse media culture, giving form to changing experiences and interpretations. Things that seem unprecedented, and are promoted as such by cultural agents, may in fact be topoi in disguise.

Huhtamo has published in academic journals like Iconics, Cinema Journal, Early Popular Visual Culture, and The Journal of Visual Culture. To date his main research achievement is the large monograph Illusions in Motion: Media Archaeology of the Moving Panorama and Related Spectacles (MIT Press, 2013). With Jussi Parikka, Huhtamo is also the editor of the anthology Media Archaeology: Approaches, Applications, and Implications (University of California Press, 2011), which helped to define the field of media archaeology. The premise of media archaeology, according to Huhtamo, is "to bring the present media culture and the culture of the past into a fruitful interaction." Beside media archaeology, Huhtamo has published on the topic of curation and museums in various anthologies, including Museum Media and Museums in a Digital Age.

== Work as exhibition curator ==
Huhtamo worked as the programmer of the Muu Media Festival, Helsinki, between 1991 and 1993 (founded in 1989 by curator Minna Tarkka). Under its auspices he curated or co-curated several international exhibitions of interactive media art for the Otso Gallery, Espoo, Finland. They featured many first rank media artists, including Jeffrey Shaw, David Rokeby, Lynn Hershman, Ken Feingold, Luc Courchesne, and Christa Sommerer and Laurent Mignonneau, among others. Huhtamo was also the co-curator of the ISEA '94 (Fifth International Symposium of Electronic Arts) Exhibition, The Museum of Contemporary Art, Atheneum, Helsinki. ISEA 94 programme was directed by Minna Tarkka.

For ISEA '94, Huhtamo co-curated the first international exhibition of the work of the Japanese media artist Toshio Iwai (b. 1962). It was seen at the Otso Gallery, Espoo, and traveled to the ZKM, Karlsruhe, and the Dutch Design Institute, Amsterdam. In the same year, Huhtamo was the visiting artistic director of the Australian International Video Festival (Sydney, June 3–5, 1994). In 1995, he co-curated Digital Mediations for Alyce de Roulet Williamson Gallery, Art Center College of Design, Pasadena, and was a member of the International Organizing Committee of The Interactive Media Festival, Los Angeles.

Huhtamo has co-curated a series of retrospective exhibitions dedicated to first rank media artists of international renown. These include Unexpected Obstacles. The Work of Perry Hoberman 1982–1997, shown at the Otso Gallery, Espoo, Finland (1997) and the ZKM, Karlsruhe (1998), Excavated Sounds: Paul DeMarinis (Otso Gallery, Espoo, 2000), Resonant Messages: Media Installations by Paul DeMarinis (Alyce de Roulet Williamson Gallery, Art Center College of Design, Pasadena, 2000–2001), and Sufficient Latitude: Interactive Wood Machines by Bernie Lubell (Alyce de Roulet Williamson Gallery, Art Center College of Design, Pasadena, 2008).

Huhtamo's largest curatorial effort to date has been the major exhibition Outoäly /Alien Intelligence (2000), which he created for the recently opened Kiasma Museum of Contemporary Art in Helsinki. Several new interactive media art installations were produced with the museum's support for this exhibition, including The Giver of Names by David Rokeby, Head (now in Kiasma's permanent collection) by Ken Feingold, and Autopoiesis by Kenneth Rinaldo.

== Appearances and experiments ==
Huhtamo appeared as an expert on the magic lantern in an episode of Storage Wars, in which a part of his personal collection of media archaeological objects can be seen. He is one of the featured specialists in Alice Arnold's documentary feature Electric Signs (Icarus Films, USA, 2012).

Beside writings and academic lectures, Huhtamo has disseminated his ideas in experimental ways. In 1998 he worked at the Institute for Visual Media at the ZKM, Karlsruhe, creating a high tech "media archaeological installation" titled The Ride of Your Life, which utilized a professional motion simulation platform. The imagery consisted of a large number of "ride films" from the early silent cinema to contemporary theme parks, edited down into a four-minute super-ride. According to Huhtamo, the installation was "an experiment in film historical discourse, a model for 'experiential film history'." The work was produced in co-operation with the Institute for Robotics at Karlsruhe University and exhibited at the SurroGate1 exhibition at the ZKM (1998).

At the Ars Electronica festival 2006, Huhtamo performed on stage in a production titled Musings on Hands, which he created together with the American media artists Golan Levin and Zachary Lieberman (Tmema). An earlier version, Media Magic: Ghost in the Hand, had already been performed by Huhtamo, Levin and Lieberman in Tokyo at Waseda University’s Ono Memorial Hall as part of an event titled Media Art Meets Media Archaeology: an Evening of Lectures & Performances (2005).

Huhtamo has given magic lantern shows using nineteenth-century magic lanterns and slides from his own collection. In August 2012 he performed a full length show titled From Dole to the Pole, or Professor Huhtamo’s Daring Adventures at the Velaslavasay Panorama, Los Angeles, assisted by the artists Amy-Claire Huestis (visual effects) and Michael Rabbitt (music and sound effects). In another stage production, Mareorama Resurrected (2011), Huhtamo impersonates, performing with a pianist and projected images, a nineteenth-century moving panorama showman lost in the twenty-first century. The production has been shown in Los Angeles, Chicago and Pittsburgh. Huhtamo presented a related "show and tell lecture" at the 60th International Short Film Festival in Oberhausen (2014).

== Collection ==
Huhtamo owns a large collection of devices and documents related to early visual culture from the eighteenth to the early twentieth century. He first exhibited his collection at the Museum of Cultures, Helsinki, as an exhibition titled "Phantasmagoria: Time Travelling in the Moving Image" (2000–2001). Most of the objects included in the exhibition, and documented in an accompanying book he wrote, Fantasmagoria: elävän kuvan arkeologiaa (BTJ Kirjastopalvelu, 2000), now belong to the Museum of the Moving Image, Helsinki, where they have been exhibited. The museum closed its doors in June 2015.

Objects and documents from Huhtamo's current, more extensive collection have been used to illustrate his book Illusions in Motion and various articles. Some examples can be seen on Huhtamo's website and in a YouTube video produced by UCLA's Daily Bruin. Huhtamo has exhibited parts of his collection at UCLA's Arts Library and Young Research Library, as well as at the Hammer Museum of Art, Los Angeles.

== Japan connection ==
In 1993 Huhtamo traveled to Tokyo to shoot a television series for YLE, the Finnish Broadcasting Company. It became The Empire of Monitors: Media Culture in Japan (1994), which he wrote and directed.

Huhtamo has frequently lectured at major academic institutions like Waseda University (Tokyo), Kyoto University, and the Institute of Advanced Media Arts and Sciences (IAMAS, Ogaki City). Ever since the project was launched in the early 1990s, he has collaborated with the NTT InterCommunication Center (Tokyo Opera City, 1997–), a major institution exhibiting technological art, by giving talks and contributing texts to its publications.

Huhtamo's texts have been translated into Japanese more than any other language. A bibliography can be found from Huhtamo's first Japanese language book Media Kokogaku - Kako Genzai Mirai no Taiwa no Tameni (2015). One of his first publications in Japanese was "An Archaeology of Moving Image Media," a special issue of the Intercommunication Quarterly (No. 14, Autumn 1995, Tokyo: NTT ICC), which he edited.

== Areas of expertise ==
- Media archaeology
- Precursors of film
- Moving panorama
- New media art

== Selected bibliography ==
- (2013) Illusions in Motion. Media Archaeology of the Moving Panorama and Related Spectacles. Cambridge, Mass.: The MIT Press.
- (2011) Media Archaeology. Approaches, Applications, and Implications. Ed. with Jussi Parikka. Berkeley, CA: University of California Press.
