= Media archaeology =

Sub-discipline of archaeology

Media archaeology or media archeology is a field that attempts to understand new and emerging media through close examination of the past, and especially through critical scrutiny of dominant progressivist narratives of popular commercial media such as film and television. Media archaeologists often evince strong interest in so-called dead media, noting that new media often revive and recirculate material and techniques of communication that had been lost, neglected, or obscured. Some media archaeologists are also concerned with the relationship between media fantasies and technological development, especially the ways in which ideas about imaginary or speculative media affect the media that actually emerge.

The theories and concepts of media archaeology have been primarily elaborated by the scholars and cultural critics Thomas Elsaesser, Erkki Huhtamo, Siegfried Zielinski, and Wolfgang Ernst, taking off from earlier work by Michel Foucault on the archaeology of knowledge, Walter Benjamin on the culture of mass media, and film scholars such as C.W. Ceram on the archaeology of cinema. Other writers who have contributed to the discipline's emergence include Eric Kluitenberg, Anne Friedberg, Friedrich Kittler, and Jonathan Crary. New media theorist Jussi Parikka defines media archaeology as follows:

Media archaeology exists somewhere between materialist media theories and the insistence on the value of the obsolete and forgotten through new cultural histories that have emerged since the 1980s. I see media archaeology as a theoretically refined analysis of the historical layers of media in their singularity—a conceptual and practical exercise in carving out the aesthetic, cultural, and political singularities of media. And it's much more than paying theoretical attention to the intensive relations between new and old media mediated through concrete and conceptual archives; increasingly, media archaeology is a method for doing media design and art.

Computer labs that archive and preserve obsolete technology are termed media archaeology labs, such as the Electronic Literature Lab that allows scholars to access electronic literature on "appropriate computer equipment."

Within the field of media archaeology, and its subfield of media archaeography, additional attention is directed towards both practical uses and theoretical analysis of modern, technologically advanced media (photography, phonography, and various audiovisual and digital records) as sources in archaeological, historical, cultural and other scientific studies, with special emphasis on research possibilities that stem from technically recorded data.

== See also ==
- Electronic Literature Lab
- The NEXT Museum, Library, and Preservation Space

== Sources ==
- Ernst, Wolfgang (2011). "Media Archaeography: Method and Machine versus History and Narrative of Media". Media Archaeology: Approaches, Applications, and Implications. Berkeley and Los Angeles: University of California Press. pp. 239–255.
