= Viral phenomenon =

Self-replicating objects or patterns

Viral phenomena or viral sensations are objects or patterns that are able to replicate themselves or convert other objects into copies of themselves when these objects are exposed to them. Analogous to the way in which viruses propagate, the term viral pertains to a video, image, or written content spreading to numerous online users within a short time period. This concept has become a common way to describe how thoughts, information, and trends move into and through a human population.

The popularity of viral media has been fueled by the rapid rise of social network sites, wherein audiences—who are metaphorically described as experiencing "infection", "contamination", or "outbreak"—play as passive carriers rather than an active role to 'spread' content, making such content "go viral". The term viral media differs from spreadable media as the latter refers to the potential of content to become viral. Memes are one known example of informational viral patterns.

== History ==
=== Terminology ===
==== Meme ====
The word meme was coined by Richard Dawkins in his 1976 book The Selfish Gene as an attempt to explain memetics; or, how ideas replicate, mutate, and evolve. When asked to assess this comparison, Lauren Ancel Meyers, a biology professor at the University of Texas, stated that "memes spread through online social networks similarly to the way diseases do through offline populations." This dispersion of cultural movements is shown through the spread of memes online, especially when seemingly innocuous or trivial trends spread and die in rapid fashion.

==== Viral ====
The term viral pertains to a video, image, or written content spreading to numerous online users within a short time period. If something goes viral, many people discuss it. Accordingly, Tony D. Sampson defines viral phenomena as spreadable accumulations of events, objects, and affects that are overall content built up by popular discourses surrounding network culture. There is also a relationship to the biological notion of disease spread and epidemiology. In this context, "going viral" is similar to an epidemic spread, which occurs if more than one person is infected by a pathogen for every person infected. Thus, if a piece of content is shared with more than one person every time it is seen, then this will result in viral growth.

In Understanding Media (1964), philosopher Marshall McLuhan describes photography in particular, and technology in general, as having a potentially "virulent nature." In Jean Baudrillard's 1981 treatise Simulacra and Simulation, the philosopher describes An American Family, arguably the first "reality" television series, as a marker of a new age in which the medium of television has a "viral, endemic, chronic, alarming presence." In an interview with Andrew Callaghan, Rapper Afroman claims the term was invented to describe the popularity of his song "Because I got High."

Another formulation of the 'viral' concept includes the term media virus, or viral media, coined by Douglas Rushkoff, who defines it as a type of Trojan horse: "People are duped into passing a hidden agenda while circulating compelling content." Mosotho South-African media theorist Thomas Mofolo uses Rushkoff's idea to define viral as a type of virtual collective consciousness that primarily manifests via digital media networks and evolves into offline actions to produce a new social reality. Mofolo bases this definition on a study about how internet users involved in the Tunisian Arab Spring perceived the value of Facebook towards their revolution. Mofolo's understanding of the viral was first developed in a study on Global Citizen's #TogetherAtHome campaign and used to formulate a new theoretical framework called Hivemind Impact. Hivemind impact is a specific type of virality that is simulated via digital media networks with the goal of harnessing the virtual collective consciousness to take action on a social issue. For Mofolo, the viral eventually evolves into McLuhan's 'global village' when the virtual collective consciousness reaches a point of noogenesis that then becomes the noosphere.

Content is more likely to reach this point, however, if it embodies certain characteristics that drive consumers to share. Research conducted by Dr. Jonah Berger at The University of Pennsylvania, summarized in his book Contagious: Why Things Catch On, suggests that content’s shareability can be increased by activating six key S.T.E.P.P.S. (i.e., Social currency, Triggers, Emotion, Public, Practical value, and Stories).

Social currency refers to the fact that people are more likely to share things that make them look good, rather than bad. Consequently, the more sharing something makes people look smart, special, or in the know, the more likely they are to pass it on.

Triggers – top of mind means tip of tongue. Sharing something requires thinking about it first, so the more people are reminded about a particular thing, the more likely they are to share it. Rebecca Black’s viral hit “Friday” gained traction from the built-in trigger of the end of the week.

Emotion – when we care, we share. The more something activates emotion, particularly high arousal ones, the more likely people are to pass it on. An advertisement that tugs on heartstrings is more likely to be shared than an unemotional one.

Public – People tend to imitate others. But they can only imitate what others are doing if they can see it. So the easier it is to see what others are doing, the easier it is to imitate. Visible colors, patterns, or logos as well as things like "I voted" stickers facilitate imitation.

Practical value – word of mouth. If something is of value, people tend to share it with others. Saving time or money, sharing useful knowledge are good examples of that

Stories are vessels, or carriers of information. They bring products, services, and ideas along with them. So building a Trojan Horse Story can be a way to get something to spread.

=== Content sharing ===
==== Early history ====
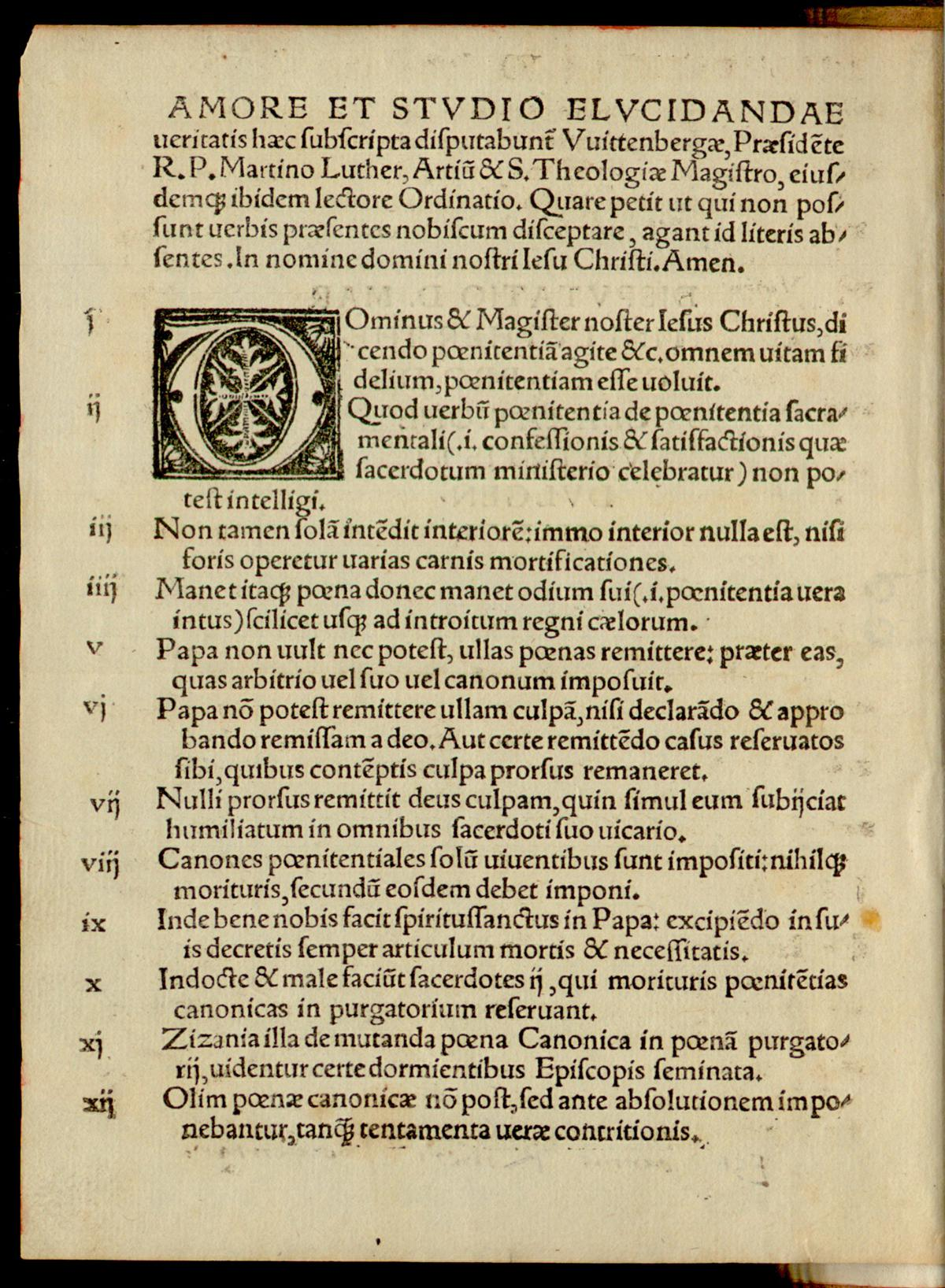
A page from Martin Luther's Ninety-five Theses, which was widely and rapidly distributed in 1517

Before writing and while most people were illiterate, the dominant means of spreading memes was oral culture like folk tales, folk songs, and oral poetry, which mutated over time as each retelling presented an opportunity for change. The printing press provided an easy way to copy written texts instead of handwritten manuscripts. In particular, pamphlets could be published in only a day or two, unlike books which took longer. For example, Martin Luther's Ninety-five Theses took only two months to spread throughout Europe. A study of United States newspapers in the 1800s found human-interest, "news you can use" stories and list-focused articles circulated nationally as local papers mailed copies to each other and selected content for reprinting. Chain letters spread by postal mail throughout the 1900s.

Urban legends also began as word-of-mouth memes. Like hoaxes, they are examples of falsehoods that people swallow, and, like them, often achieve broad public notoriety.

==== CompuServ ====
Beyond vocal sharing, the 20th century made huge strides in the World Wide Web and the ability to content share. In 1979, dial-up internet service provided by the company CompuServ was a key player in online communications and how information began spreading beyond the print. Those with access to a computer in the earliest of stages could not comprehend the full effect that public access to the internet could or would create. It is hard to remember the times of newspapers being delivered to households across the country in order to receive their news for the day, and it was when The Columbus Dispatch out of Columbus, Ohio broke barriers when it was first to publish in online format. The success that was predicted by CompuServe and the Associated Press led to some of the largest newspapers to become part of the movement to publish the news via online format. Content sharing in the journalism world brings new advances to viral aspects of how news is spread in a matter of seconds.

==== Internet memes ====
The creation of the Internet enabled users to select and share content with each other electronically, providing new, faster, and more decentralized controlled channels for spreading memes. Email forwards are essentially text memes, often including jokes, hoaxes, email scams, written versions of urban legends, political messages, and digital chain letters; if widely forwarded they might be called 'viral emails'. User-friendly consumer photo editing tools like Photoshop and image-editing websites have facilitated the creation of the genre of the image macro, where a popular image is overlaid with different humorous text phrases. These memes are typically created with Impact font. The growth of video-sharing websites like YouTube and Tiktok made viral videos possible.

It is sometimes difficult to predict which images and videos will "go viral"; sometimes the creation of a new Internet celebrity is a sudden surprise. One example of a viral video is "Numa Numa", a webcam video of then-19-year-old Gary Brolsma lip-syncing and dancing to the Romanian pop song "Dragostea Din Tei".

The sharing of text, images, videos, or links to this content have been greatly facilitated by social media such as Facebook and Twitter. Other mimicry memes carried by Internet media include hashtags, language variations like intentional misspellings, and fads like planking. The popularity and widespread distribution of Internet memes have gotten the attention of advertisers, creating the field of viral marketing. A person, group, or company desiring much fast, cheap publicity might create a hashtag, image, or video designed to go viral; many such attempts are unsuccessful, but the few posts that "go viral" generate much publicity.

== Types ==
=== Viral videos ===
Viral videos are among the most common type of viral phenomena. A viral video is any clip of animation or film that is spread rapidly through online sharing. Viral videos can receive millions of views as they are shared on social media sites, reposted to blogs, sent in emails and so on. When a video goes viral it has become very popular. Its exposure on the Internet grows exponentially as more and more people discover it and share it with others. An article or an image can also become viral.

The classification is probably assigned more as a result of intensive activity and the rate of growth among users in a relatively short amount of time than of simply how many hits something receives. Most viral videos contain humor and fall into broad categories:

- Unintentional: Videos that the creators never intended to go viral. These videos may have been posted by the creator or shared with friends, who then spread the content. (e.g. 67)
- Humorous: Videos that have been created specifically to entertain people. If a video is funny enough, it will spread.
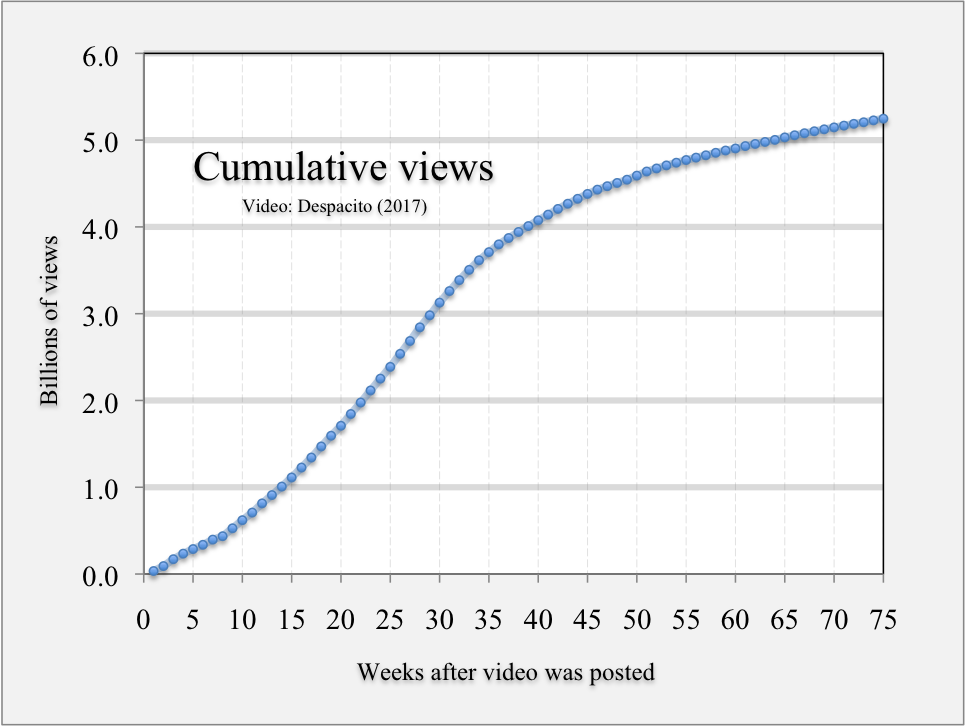
- A graph of "Despacito" by Luis Fonsi going viral
  Musical: Since the introduction of viral phenomena on the internet, it has served as a means of not only skyrocketing independent tracks onto the music charts, but some artists have had their entire career rooted in an introduction to the music industry via viral content. Perhaps the most notable of these artists being Justin Bieber, whose career was launched following his talent being showcased over his YouTube channel in the late 2000s. Today, platforms such as TikTok, cater to independent musical talent and consistently spearhead the rise of new artists in music.
- Promotional: Videos that are designed to go viral with a marketing message to raise brand awareness. Promotional viral videos fall under viral marketing practices.
- Charity: Videos created and spread in order to collect donations. For instance, Ice Bucket challenge was a hit on social networks in the summer of 2014.
- Art performances: a video created by artists to raise the problem, express ideas and the freedom of creativity.
- Political: Viral videos are powerful tools for politicians to boost their popularity. Barack Obama campaign launched Yes We Can slogan as a viral video on YouTube. "The Obama campaign posted almost 800 videos on YouTube, and the McCain campaign posted just over 100. The pro-Obama video "Yes we can" went viral after being uploaded to YouTube in February 2008." Other political viral videos served not as a promotion but as an agent for support and unification. Social media was actively employed in the Arab Spring. "The Tunisian uprising had special resonance in Egypt because it was prompted by incidents of police corruption and viral social media condemnation of them."

==== YouTube effect ====
With the creation of YouTube, a video-sharing website, there has been a huge surge in the number of viral videos on the Internet. This is primarily due to the ease of access to these videos and the ease of sharing them via social media websites. The ability to share videos from one person to another with ease means there are many cases of 'overnight' viral videos. "YouTube, which makes it easy to embed its content elsewhere have the freedom and mobility once ascribed to papyrus, enabling their rapid circulation across a range of social networks." YouTube has overtaken television in terms of the size of audience. As one example, American Idol was the most viewable TV show in 2009 in the U.S. while "a video of Scottish woman Susan Boyle auditioning for Britain's Got Talent with her singing was viewed more than 77 million times on YouTube". The capacity to attract an enormous audience on a user-friendly platform is one of the leading factors why YouTube generates viral videos. YouTube contributes to viral phenomenon spreadability since the idea of the platform is based on sharing and contribution. "Sites such as YouTube, eBay, Facebook, Flickr, Craigslist, and Wikipedia, only exist and have value because people use and contribute to them, and they are clearly better the more people are using and contributing to them. This is the essence of Web 2.0."

An example of one of the most prolific viral YouTube videos that fall into the promotional viral videos category is Kony 2012. On March 5, 2012, the charity organization Invisible Children Inc. posted a short film about the atrocities committed in Uganda by Joseph Kony and his rebel army. Artists use YouTube as their one of the main branding and communication platform to spread videos and make them viral. YouTube viral videos make stars. As an example, Justin Bieber who was discovered since his video on YouTube Chris Brown's song "With You" went viral. Since its launch in 2005, YouTube has become a hub for aspiring singers and musicians. Talent managers look to it to find budding pop stars.

According to Visible Measures, the original "Kony 2012" video documentary, and the hundreds of excerpts and responses uploaded by audiences across the Web, collectively garnered 100 million views in a record six days. This example of how quickly the video spread emphasizes how YouTube acts as a catalyst in the spread of viral media. YouTube is considered as "multiple existing forms of participatory culture" and that trend is useful for the sake of business. "The discourse of Web 2.0 its power has been its erasure of this larger history of participatory practices, with companies acting as if they were "bestowing" agency onto audiences, making their creative output meaningful by valuing it within the logics of commodity culture."

=== Viral disinformation and harmful content ===
Viral social media platforms such as TikTok have been using algorithms in their websites to recommend content that they feel their users will enjoy. Videos that go viral on these platforms could include a range of content that can be helpful or hurtful. Social platforms such as TikTok give people a "stage" to spread information at an accelerated rate, this may or may not expose people to subjective information with no screening from actual humans. This can involve disinformation, misinformation, and malinformation. In some cases, the algorithms used by social media platforms fail to realize the content it is pushing is false or harmful and may continue to market the content even though it is against the platform's terms and conditions. In other cases, the algorithms actively push this content to increase their engagement to capture online advertising revenue. This means that ideologies such as fascism, white supremacy, and misogyny may be easily accessed and sometimes forced into users feeds. Other content being promoted on platforms that may be harmful include; anti-LGBTQIA+, anti- Black, antisemitic, anti-Muslim, anti-Asian, anti-migrant, anti-Palestinian, and refugees viewpoints.

Users who spread disinformation use the algorithms of video platforms, like YouTube or TikTok, exploit engagement tools in order to get their content viral. Users employ hashtags that influence the recommendation algorithm: generic hashtags (#foryou; #fyp; #abc; # xyzbca; etc.) as well as the hashtags of trending topics. Users who want to spread disinformation also intentionally use variations of banned terms to evade content moderation. These misspelled terms have the same meaning and influence as the original terms. Users who want to spread disinformation use other tools that allow their videos to get viral: content elements such as point of view, scale, style, text, as well as the time their content is more likely to get viral. Also, the more emotion the content raises, the more chance the content has to get viral.

Users who spread disinformation that violates TikTok's terms and conditions have multiple methods of getting around these rules. One way that a user can do this is by respawned accounts, to do this a user will create a new account after they have been banned they use a similar user name to their previous one so they can easily be found again. Another way users can get around terms and conditions is by a multiple part video series on their account where they often spell out racial slurs and hate speech. This not only gets a users account more views which could result in the algorithm pushing their content more but also evades the rules set by the developers as the algorithm has trouble flagging these multiple part videos.

=== Viral marketing ===
Viral marketing is the phenomenon in which people actively assess media or content and decide to spread to others such as making a word-of-mouth recommendation, passing content through social media, posting a video to YouTube. The term was first popularized in 1995, after Hotmail spreading their service offer "Get your free web-base email at Hotmail." Viral marketing has become important in the business field in building brand recognition, with companies trying to get their customers and other audiences involved in circulating and sharing their content on social media both in voluntary and involuntary ways. Many brands undertake guerrilla marketing or buzz marketing to gain public attention. Some marketing campaigns seek to engage an audience to unwittingly pass along their campaign message.

The use of viral marketing is shifting from the concept that the content drives its own attention to the intended attempt to draw the attention. The companies are worried about making their content 'go viral' and how their customers' communication has the potential to circulate it widely. There has been much discussion about morality in doing viral marketing. Iain Short (2010) points out that many applications on Twitter and Facebook generates automated marketing message and update it on the audience's personal timelines without users personally pass it along.

Stacy Wood from North Carolina State University has conducted research and found that the value of recommendations from 'everyday people' has a potential impact on the brands. Consumers have been bombarded by thousands of messages every day which makes authenticity and credibility of marketing message been questioned; word of mouth from 'everyday people' therefore becomes an incredibly important source of credible information. If a company sees that the word-of-mouth from "the average person" is crucial for the greater opportunity for influencing others, many questions remain. "What implicit contracts exist between brands and those recommenders? What moral codes and guidelines should brands respect when encouraging, soliciting, or reacting to comments from those audiences they wish to reach? What types of compensation, if any, do audience members deserve for their promotional labor when they provide a testimonial."

An example of effective viral marketing can be the unprecedented boost in sales of the Popeyes chicken sandwich. After the Twitter account for Chick-fil-A attempted to undercut Popeyes by suggesting that Popeyes' chicken sandwich was not the "original chicken sandwich", Popeyes responded with a tweet that would end up going viral. After the response had amassed 85,000 retweets and 300,000 likes, Popeyes chains began to sell many more sandwiches to the point where many locations sold all of their stock of chicken sandwiches. This prompted other chicken chains to tweet about their chicken sandwiches, but none of these efforts became as widespread as it was for Popeyes.

=== Financial contagion ===
In macroeconomics, "financial contagion" is a proposed socially-viral phenomenon wherein disturbances quickly spread across global financial markets.

== Evaluation by commentators ==
Some social commentators have a negative view of "viral" content, though others are neutral or celebrate the democratization of content as compared to the gatekeepers of older media. According to the authors of Spreadable Media: Creating Value and Meaning in a Networked Culture: "Ideas are transmitted, often without critical assessment, across a broad array of minds and this uncoordinated flow of information is associated with "bad ideas" or "ruinous fads and foolish fashions." Science fiction sometimes discusses 'viral' content "describing (generally bad) ideas that spread like germs." For example, the 1992 novel Snow Crash explores the implications of an ancient memetic meta-virus and its modern-day computer virus equivalent:

We are all susceptible to the pull of viral ideas. Like mass hysteria. Or a tune that gets into your head that you keep on humming all day until you spread it to someone else. Jokes. Urban legends. Crackpot religions. No matter how smart we get, there is always this deep irrational part that makes us potential hosts for self-replicating information.

— Snow Crash (1992)

The spread of viral phenomena is also regarded as part of the cultural politics of network culture or the virality of the age of networks. Network culture enables the audience to create and spread viral content. "Audiences play an active role in 'spreading' content rather than serving as passive carriers of viral media: their choices, investments, agendas, and actions determine what gets valued." Various authors have pointed to the intensification in connectivity brought about by network technologies as a possible trigger for increased chances of infection from wide-ranging social, cultural, political, and economic contagions. For example, the social scientist Jan van Dijk warns of new vulnerabilities that arise when network society encounters "too much connectivity." The proliferation of global transport networks makes this model of society susceptible to the spreading of biological diseases. Digital networks become volatile under the destructive potential of computer viruses and worms. Enhanced by the rapidity and extensiveness of technological networks, the spread of social conformity, political rumor, fads, fashions, gossip, and hype threatens to destabilize established political order.

Links between viral phenomena that spread on digital networks and the early sociological theories of Gabriel Tarde have been made in digital media theory by Tony D Sampson (2012; 2016). In this context, Tarde's social imitation thesis is used to argue against the biological deterministic theories of cultural contagion forwarded in memetics. In its place, Sampson proposes a Tarde-inspired somnambulist media theory of the viral.

== See also ==
- Viral video – Video that becomes popular via Internet sharing
- Viral marketing – Marketing strategy that uses existing social networks to promote a product
- Viral license – Preservation of legal rights in the reuse of a work
- List of Internet phenomena
- Mainstream media – Mass news media that influence many people
- Media circus – Phrase describing excessive media coverage
- Sensationalism – Type of editorial tactic used in mass media
- Social phenomenon – Phenomenon involving multiple organisms reacting to each other
- Meme – Cultural idea that spreads through imitation
- Fad – Collective behavior that achieves short-lived popularity
- Real life – Phrase discerning reality from fiction or social media
- Transitive relation – Type of binary relation
- Tony D. Sampson – British critical theorist (born 1964) (thesis and book Virality)
- Computer virus – Computer program that modifies other programs to replicate itself and spread
- Network science – Academic field
- Compartmental models in epidemiology – Type of mathematical model used for infectious diseases
