= Jussi Parikka =

Finnish new media theorist

Jussi Ville Tuomas Parikka (born 1976 in Anjalankoski) is a Finnish new media theorist and Professor in Digital Aesthetics and Culture at Aarhus University, Denmark. He is also (visiting) Professor in Technological Culture & Aesthetics at Winchester School of Art (University of Southampton) as well as visiting professor at FAMU at the Academy of Performing Arts in Prague. In Finland, he is Docent of digital culture theory at the University of Turku. Until May 2011 Parikka was the Director of the Cultures of the Digital Economy (CoDE) research institute at Anglia Ruskin University and the founding Co-Director of the Anglia Research Centre for Digital Culture. With Ryan Bishop, he also founded the Archaeologies of Media and Technology research unit.

== Biography ==
Parikka was awarded a Ph.D. in Cultural History from the University of Turku in 2007. He is a member of the Editorial Board for the Fibreculture journal and a member of the Leonardo Journal Digital Reviews Panel. In 1995, Parikka deferred his national service and spent 18 months as an assistant fisheries inspector in Oulu. In 2021 Parikka was elected as member of the Academia Europaea in the Film, Media & Visual Studies section.

== Work ==
Parikka has published extensively on digital art, digital culture and cultural theory in Finnish and English in journals such as CTheory, Theory, Culture & Society, Fibreculture, Media History, Postmodern Culture and Game Studies. His texts have been translated into Hungarian, Czech, French, Turkish, Polish, Portuguese, Chinese, Italian, Spanish, and Indonesian. He has published five single authored books; in Finnish on media theory in the age of cybernetics (Koneoppi. Ihmisen, teknologian ja median kytkennät, (2004)) and in English, Digital Contagions: A Media Archaeology of Computer Viruses (2007), the award-winning Insect Media (2010), What is Media Archaeology? (2012) and A Geology of Media (2015). Parikka is also part of the co-authored short book Remain (2019).

Digital Contagions is the first book to offer a comprehensive and critical analysis of the culture and history of the computer virus phenomenon. The book maps the anomalies of network culture from the angles of security concerns, the biopolitics of digital systems, and the aspirations for artificial life in software.

The genealogy of network culture is approached from the standpoint of accidents that are endemic to the digital media ecology. Viruses, worms, and other software objects are not, then, seen merely from the perspective of anti-virus research or practical security concerns, but as cultural and historical expressions that traverse a non-linear field from fiction to technical media, from net art to politics of software.

His work on Insect Media combines themes from media archaeology, posthumanism and animal studies to put forth a new history of how insects and technology frame critical, scientific and technological thought. It won the Society for Cinema and Media Studies 2012 Anne Friedberg Award for Innovative Scholarship. He has also discussed this work in dialogue with historian Etienne Benson and media theorist Bernard Dionsius Geoghegan on the Cultural Technologies podcast.

Parikka has written on media archaeology as a theory and methodology in various publications, including Media Archaeology (co-edited with Erkki Huhtamo) and What is Media Archaeology? With Joasia Krysa he edited a volume on the Finnish media art figure Erkki Kurenniemi in 2015.

With Garnet Hertz, Parikka co-authored a paper entitled "Zombie Media: Circuit Bending Media Archaeology into an Art Method," which was nominated for the 2011 Transmediale Vilem Flusser media theory award.

Parikka led the Operational Images and Visual Culture research project (2019-2023) at the Academy of Performing Arts in Prague as well as the Design and Aesthetics for Environmental Data project (2022-2024) at Aarhus University.

== Research activity ==
Dr. Parikka's research activities include continental philosophy, media theory, the politics and history of new media, media archaeology, new materialist cultural analysis and various other topics relating to anomalies, media and the body.

== Areas of expertise ==
- Cultural theory
- Cyborgs and other approaches to the body in cyberculture
- Digital culture, new media and the Internet
- Media archaeology
- Technoculture

== See also ==
- Media archeology
- Software art
- Internet art

== Bibliography ==
- (2024) Living Surfaces. Images, Plants, and Environments of Media (co-authored with Abelardo Gil-Fournier). Cambridge, MA: The MIT Press.
- (2023) Operational Images. From the Visual to the Invisual. Minneapolis: University of Minnesota Press
- (2022) The Lab Book: Situated Practices in Media Studies (co-authored with Lori Emerson and Darren Wershler). Minneapolis: University of Minnesota Press
- (2019) Remain (co-authored with Rebecca Schneider and Ioana B. Jucan). University of Minnesota Press and Meson Press.
- (2015) A Geology of Media, University of Minnesota Press: Minneapolis.
- (2014) The Anthrobscene, University of Minnesota Press: Minneapolis.
- (2012) What is Media Archaeology?, Polity: Cambridge.
- (2010) Insect Media: An Archaeology of Animals and Technology, University of Minnesota Press: Minneapolis. Posthumanities-series.
- (2007) Digital Contagions. A Media Archaeology of Computer Viruses, Peter Lang: New York. Digital Formations-series. ISBN 978-0-8204-8837-0
- (2004) Koneoppi. Ihmisen, teknologian ja median kytkennät. Kulttuurituotannon ja maisemantutkimuksen laitoksen julkaisuja, University of Turku: Pori. (Machinology: The Interfaces of Humans, Technology and Media). ISBN 951-29-2569-9

== Edited books and special issues ==
- (2021) Photography Off the Scale (with Tomáš Dvořák). Edinburgh: Edinburgh University Press.
- (2020) Archaeologies of Fashion Film (with Caroline Evans). A special issue of Journal of Visual Culture, December 2020.
- (2016) Mediated Geologies. A Special section of Cultural Politics journal (Duke University Press).
- (2016) Across and Beyond: Postdigital Practices, Concepts, and Institutions. (With Ryan Bishop, Kristoffer Gansing, and Elvia Wilk). Berlin: Sternberg.
- (2015) Writing and Unwriting (Media) Art History: Erkki Kurenniemi in 2048 (with Joasia Krysa). Cambridge, MA: The MIT Press
- (2013) Cultural Techniques-special in Theory, Culture & Society ( with Ilinca Iurascu and Geoffrey Winthrop-Young.) Theory, Culture & Society 30.6.
- (2011) Medianatures: The Materiality of Information Technology and Electronic Waste. Open Humanities Press, Living Books About Life -series. ISBN 978-1-60785-261-2.
- (2011) Media Archaeology. Approaches, Applications, Implications. With Erkki Huhtamo. Berkeley, CA: University of California Press.
- (2011) Unnatural Ecologies. Media ecology-special issue for Fibreculture 17, co-edited with Michael Goddard.
- (2009) The Spam Book: On Viruses, Porn, and Other Anomalies from the Dark Side of Digital Culture. With Tony D Sampson. Cresskill: Hampton Press.
- (2008) In Medias Res. Hakuja mediafilosofiaan. (With Olli-Jukka Jokisaari & Pasi Väliaho). Eetos-julkaisusarja, Turku. [In Medias Res: On Continental Media Philosophy.]
- (2003) Aivot ja elokuva-erikoisnumero Lähikuva 2/2003 (With Pasi Väliaho). [Brain and Cinema-special issue.]
- (2003) Kohtaamisia ajassa - kulttuurihistoria ja tulkinnan teoria. (With Sakari Ollitervo and Timo Väntsi). Turun yliopisto, k & h-kustannus, Kulttuurihistoria-Cultural History 3. [Encounters in Time: Cultural History and Theory of Interpretation.]
- (2003) Mediataide-erikoisnumero Widerscreen 3/2003. (With Katve-Kaisa Kontturi).[Media art-special issue.]

== Articles ==
- (2020) “Ground Truth to Fake Geographies: Machine Vision and Learning in Visual Practices” (With Abelardo Gil-Fournier). AI & Society November 2020.
- (2020) "A Recursive Web of Models: Studio Tomas Sáraceno's Working Objects as Environmental Humanities" Configurations 28:3, 309-332.
- (2020) “Folds of Fashion: Unravelled and the Planetary Surface” in Apparition: The (Im)materiality of the Modern Surface”, edited by Yeseung Lee. London: Bloomsbury, 19-35.
- (2019) “The Lab is the Place is the Space” in Emerging Affinities. Possible Futures of Performative Arts, eds. Mateusz Borowski, Mateusz Chaberski and Malgorzata Sugiera. Transcript Verlag.
- (2019) “Inventing Pasts and Futures. Speculative Design and Media Archaeology” in New Media Archaeologies, edited by Ben Roberts and Mark Goodall. Amsterdam: Amsterdam University Press, 205-232.
- (2018) “Handmade Films and Artist-run Labs: The Chemical Sites of Film’s Counterculture.” (With Rossella Catanese) NECSUS – The European Journal of Media Studies, Autumn 2019.
- (2018) “Middle-East and Other Futurisms: Imaginary Temporalities in Contemporary Art and Visual Culture.” Culture, Theory and Critique vol. 59: 1, 40-58.
- (2017) “The Underpinning Time: From Digital Memory to Network Microtemporality” in Digital Memory Studies. Media Pasts in Transition, ed. Andrew Hoskins. New York and London: Routledge,156-172
- (2017) "The Sensed Smog: Smart Ubiquitous Cities and the Sensorial Body”" Fibreculture journal issue 29.
- (2016) “Planetary Goodbyes: Post-History and Future Memories of an Ecological Past” in Memory in Motion. Archives, Technology and the Social, Edited by Ina Blom, Trond Lundemo, and Eivind Rossaak. Amsterdam: Amsterdam University Press, 2016, 129-152.
- (2016) “Deep Times of Planetary Trouble” Cultural Politics Vol 12 (3), November 2016,. 279-292.
- (2016) “The Signal Haunted Cold War: The Persistence of the SIGINT Ontology” in Cold War Legacies: Systems, Theory, Aesthetics, eds. John Beck and Ryan Bishop. Edinburgh: University of Edinburgh Press, 167-187.
- (2016) “So-Called Nature: Friedrich Kittler and Ecological Media Materialism” in Sustainable Media, eds. Nicole Starosielski and Janet Walker. New York: Routledge, 196-211.
- (2015) “Postscript: Of Disappearances and the Ontology of Media Studies” in Media After Kittler, eds. Eleni Ikoniadou and Scott Wilson, London: Rowman & Littlefield International.
- (2015) “Earth Forces: Contemporary Media Land Arts and New Materialist Aesthetics” Cultural Studies Review, vol. 21 (2).
- (2015) "Mutating Media Ecologies" continent. Volume 4, Issue 2, 24–32.
- (2015) "Media Archaeology Out Of Nature. A Conversation with Paul Feigelfeld" E-Flux, 62.
- (2014) “Cultural Techniques of Cognitive Capitalism: Metaprogramming and the Labor of Code.” Cultural Studies Review 20 (1), March 2014, 29-51.
- (2014) “McLuhan at Taksim Square”. 50th Anniversary Special Issue of Marshall McLuhan’s Understanding the Media. Journal of Visual Culture, April 2013, 13 (1), 91-93.
- (2013) “Critically Engineered Wireless Politics”. Culture Machine.
- (2012) “New Materialism as Media Theory: Medianatures and Dirty Matter” Communication and Critical/Cultural Studies Volume 9, Issue 1, Feb 10, 2012, 95-100.
- (2011) “Operative Media Archaeology: Wolfgang Ernst’s Materialist Media Diagrammatics.” Theory, Culture & Society 28(5), 52-74.
- (2011) “Mapping Noise: Techniques and Tactics of Irregularities, Interception, and Disturbance,” in Media Archaeology, eds. Erkki Huhtamo & Jussi Parikka. Berkeley, CA: University of California Press.
- (2011) “Towards and Archaeology of Media Archaeology,” (with Erkki Huhtamo) in Media Archaeology, eds. Huhtamo and Parikka. Berkeley, CA: University of California Press.
- (2011) "Media Ecologies and Imaginary Media: Transversal Expansions, Contractions and Foldings" Fibreculture 17.
- (2010) "Sublimated Attractions - The Introduction of Early Computers in Finland in the late 1950s as an Audiovisual Experience". With Jaakko Suominen. Media History 16:3, August 2010
- (2010) "Archaeologies of Media Art - Jussi Parikka in conversation with Garnet Hertz" Ctheory-journal 4/1/2010.
- (2010) "Ethologies of Software Art: What Can a Digital Body of Code Do?" In: Deleuze and Contemporary Art, edited by Simon O'Sullivan and Stephen Zepke. Edinburgh: Edinburgh University Press
- (2010) "Archaeology of Imaginary Media: Insects and Affects." In: Verbindungen/Jonctions 10, Brussels.
- (2009) "Archives of Software: Computer Viruses and the Aesthesis of Media Accidents." In: The Spam Book: On Viruses, Porn, and Other Anomalies from the Dark Side of Digital Culture. Eds. Jussi Parikka & Tony D Sampson. Cresskill: Hampton Press
- (2009) "On Anomalous Objects of Network Culture. An Introduction." With Tony D Sampson. In: The Spam Book: On Viruses, Porn, and Other Anomalies from the Dark Side of Digital Culture. Eds. Parikka & Sampson. Cresskill: Hampton Press
- (2008) "Insect Technics." In: (Un)Likely Alliance - Thinking the Environment(s) with Deleuze/Guattari, edited by Bernd Herzogenrath. Newcastle: Cambridge Scholars Publishing, 339-362.
- (2008) "Politics of Swarms: Translations Between Entomology and Biopolitics." Parallax vol. 14, issue 3.
- (2008) "Copy." In: Software Studies. A Lexicon. Edited by Matthew Fuller. Cambridge, MA: The MIT Press.
- (2007) "Contagion and Repetition - On the Viral Logic of Contemporary Culture." Ephemera - Theory & Politics in Organization vol.7, no.2, (May 2007).
- (2007) "Fictitious Viruses - Computer Virus in the Science-Fiction Literature of the 1970s." In: SciFi in the Minds Eye: Reading Science Through Science Fiction. Edited by Margret Grebowicz. Open Court Publishing.
- (2007) "Insects, Sex and Biodigitality in Lynn Hershman Leeson's Teknolust." Postmodern Culture volume 17, 2/2007.
- (2007) "Control and Accident: Images of Thought in the Age of Cybernetics." NMEDIAC - The Journal of New Media and Culture vol. 4 no. 1.
- (2006) "Victorian Snakes? Towards A Cultural History of Mobile Games and the Experience of Movement." Game Studies 1/2006. (With Jaakko Suominen.)
- (2006) "Kohti materiaalisen ja uuden kulttuurianalyysia, eli representaation hyödystä ja haitasta elämälle." (With Milla Tiainen). Kulttuurintutkimus 2/2006, 3-20.
- (2005) "The Universal Viral Machine - Bits, Parasites and the Media Ecology of Network Culture." CTheory - An International Journal of Theory, Technology and Culture, 15.12.2005. Translation in Portuguese ("A Máquina Viral Universal", Fileguest 2006 conference catalogue, Rio de Janeiro). The English version also republished in the Spanish Aminima-magazine.
- (2005) "Digital Monsters, Binary Aliens - Computer Viruses, Capitalism and the Flow of Information." Fibreculture, issue 4. A new version republished in 2010 by Thirdsound Press.
- (2005) "Viral Noise and the (Dis)Order of the Digital Culture". M/C Journal of Media / Culture. Vol. 7, issue 6 (Jan. 2005).
