= Tony D. Sampson =

British critical theorist (born 1964)

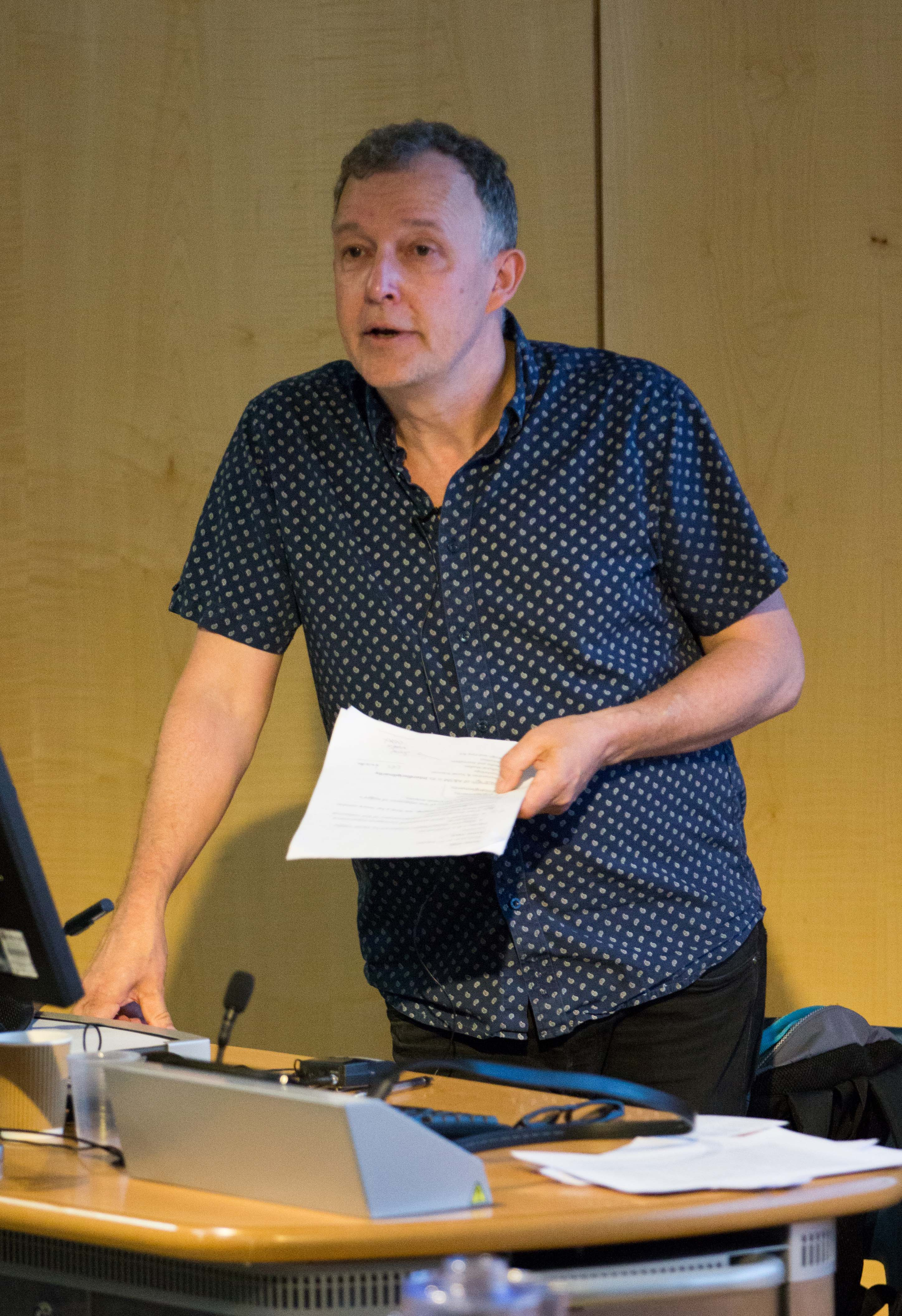
Sampson in 2017

Tony D. Sampson (born 1964) is a British academic author who writes about philosophies of affect, digital media cultures and labour, marketing power, design/brand thinking, social and immersive user experiences and neurocultures. He is best known for his widely cited and debated academic publications on virality, network contagion and neuroculture. This work is influenced by the 19th century French sociologist, Gabriel Tarde and concerns contemporary analyses of viral phenomena and affective and emotional contagion on the Internet. In 2017 Sampson published The Assemblage Brain, a book about the culture of the affective brain explored through digital media, the neurosciences, business (marketing), cybernetics and political power. His most recent publication, A Sleepwalker's Guide to Social Media (2020), explores the power dynamic of a post-Cambridge Analytica social media environment wherein the marketing logic of virality/growth helps to inflame contagions of race hate, posing a threat to democracy.

== Education and career ==
Sampson has a PhD in contagion theory from the Sociology Department at the University of Essex in the UK. He is a former art student who re-entered higher education in the UK as a mature student in the mid-1990s after working as a musician in the 1980s. His career in education has moved through various disciplines and departments, including maths and computing, sociology, arts, media and design. He currently specialises in critical theories of digital communication and marketing power at the Essex Business School (University of Essex).

Sampson is on the editorial board of the US based affect philosophy journal Capacious and UK based International Journal of Creative Media Research.

He is a co-founder of the community engagement initiatives, Club Critical Theory and the Cultural Engine Research Group (CERG).

== Debates and comments on Sampson's virality thesis ==
In 2012 Sampson published the book Virality: Contagion Theory in the Age of Networks, which is described by the media theorist and author Eduardo Navas in a Huffington Post review as "an important interdisciplinary contribution to the understanding of network cultures." Since its publication, Sampson's Virality thesis has been "widely discussed" due to its revaluation of the "too much connectivity thesis" and focus instead on "assemblages of affective encounter." Sampson's Virality presents a theory of universal contagion that challenges theories, like memetics, which rely on metaphorical and analogical references to biological epidemics to explain social and cultural contagion. For example, in an analysis of how the ice-bucket challenge spread pervasively on social media, marketing researcher and author George Rossolatos uses Sampson's revival of Tardean sociology, and the "coinage of the virality perspective," to argue for "a more nuanced understanding of how memes propagate in the current networked economy of signs."

Others have used Sampson's Virality thesis to discuss political contagion. Looking at the case of so-called Obama Love (or Hope) during the 2008 US election of Barack Obama, Laurie Gries' new materialist book on political rhetoric draws on Sampson's "explications of Tarde's social epidemiological diagram" to show how Obama Hope "exert[ed] an indirect mesmeric and magnetic force that attracts various entities into relation and induces imitative encounters." Similarly, in her book Obama is Brazilian, the author Emanuelle Oliveira-Monte singles out what Sampson calls the "empathic virality of love" mobilized by the Obama campaign to explain the "universal appeal" of Obama himself.

Sampson's work on Tarde is further discussed in the context of social media. In his work on Facebook, for example, Tero Karppi from the University of Toronto notes how Sampson's use of Tarde to think about subjectivity points to a "convergence in our current social media landscape... [that stresses the] semi-conscious nature of human subjects that 'sleepwalk through everyday life mesmerized and contaminated by the fascinations of their social environment' (Sampson, 2012: 13)."

In the area of film theory, Selmin Kara uses Sampson's Virality thesis to set out an "interpretive framework for understanding how documentary hooliganism operates" virally on the Internet. Looking at the possibilities of a viral artivist movement, she describes how 'affective contagious encounters' among anonymous crowds, in the artivist practices of Ai Weiwei and Turkish protesters point to the potential of unruly forms of documentation to influence and inspire self-organized mobilization."

In their book, Risk and Hyperconnectivity: Media and Memories of Neoliberalism, Andrew Hoskins and John Tulloch note how Sampson's work on media and financial contagion adds a "critical kick in the tail" to an old form of media and cultural studies that previously emphasized public empowerment through access to media. As an alternative, Hoskins and Tulloch cite Sampson's discussion on herd instinct and his use of Tarde's figure of the somnambulist (the sleepwalker) to alternatively describe human users of media systems as mostly docile.

Others have used and adapted Sampson's Virality thesis and work on spam cultures to support discussions on contagions of student protests, new media idiocy, alcohol and drug use, online emotion, viral memorials, Kony 2012, the politics of the selfie, "Je suis Charlie" and so on.

== Criticism of virality ==
Sampson's use of Gabriel Tarde to explain the somnambulistic (sleepwalking) viral tendencies of the contemporary social media user has been critiqued by a number of authors in various fields of study. Danish writer, Christian Borch, for example, notes that the "central theoretical gain from Tarde's sociology" according to Sampson, "lies in its 'radical questioning of what constitutes social subjectivity' and in its 'concept of an agentless, half-awake subjectivity, nudged along by the force of relational encounter with contaminating events' (Sampson, 2012: 12, 13)," But Borch argues that Sampson's work needs to be seen as part of just one account of Tarde that is "too narrow in [its] interpretation of Tarde's notion of individuality." Likewise, in her work on body studies and media and cultural theory, the British academic, Lisa Blackman, locates Sampson's contagion theory of subjectivity as an example of an "assumption" in new materialist approaches in which "the phenomenologically experiencing subject is replaced by brain or body, underpinned by a variety of neurophysiological concepts."

In Lugo-Ocando, Hernández, and Marchesi's "Social Media and Virality in the 2014 Student Protests in Venezuela" Sampson's thesis is used as a theoretical approach to analyze student protests, but the authors also discuss limitations and shortcomings of the thesis in the context of Venezuelan society pointing to the role of "heavy-handed police and military intervention... the imprisonment of key opposition leaders" and a "sustained campaign in the media" to criminalize and de-legitimize students as important factors in winding down the protests.

== Body of work ==
Sampson has published extensively on digital media cultures in academic journals, books and chapters in edited collections (see selected reading below). Before publishing Virality, he co-edited the radical new media collection The Spam Book with the Finnish new media theorist, Jussi Parikka, in 2009. In 2016 he returned to Tarde's somnambulist in The Assemblage Brain: Sense Making in Neuroculture (2016) which calls for a radical critical theory of neuroculture that operates in the disciplinary interferences between philosophy, science, art, and politics. In a review of this book for the journal AI & Society, Tero Karppi describes how the brain becomes the main figure of Sampson's work because its "potential is harnessed in our contemporary culture of capitalism."

The theoretical convergence and divergences between Sampson's Assemblage Brain and N. Katherine Hayles' Unthought: The Power Of The Cognitive Nonconscious also form part of a prolonged digital humanities dialogue between the two authors, described by Gregory J. Seigworth, as "theoretically rich...[and] "offer[ring] a more widely conceptualized world of the "doings" for affect studies."

The Assemblage Brain has been discussed in articles published in Emotion, Space and Society, Distinktion: Journal of Social Theory, Theory, and Culture & Society, Annual Review of Critical Psychology, AVANT: The Journal of the Philosophical-Interdisciplinary Vanguard, and Body & Society.

In 2018 Sampson published a second co-edited book on social media (with Darren Ellis and Stephen Maddison). Affect and Social Media: Emotion, Mediation, Anxiety and Contagion draws on the Affect and Social Media (A&SM) conferences Sampson hosts in east London and brings together leading scholars from across disciplinary boundaries to conceptualise radical movements of mediated sociality. Finnish Professor of Media Studies, Susanna Paasonen, describes the work as "a thought-provoking, occasionally scary, and thoroughly fascinating exploration into the complex networked intensities within which we operate." The book includes discussion on the controversial Facebook emotional contagion experiment.

In 2020, Sampson published his third book in the contagion theory series. A Sleepwalker's Guide to Social Media looks specifically at social media after the Cambridge Analytica scandal. Like the previous books, this text draws on a wide range of theorists, including A.N. Whitehead and Gabriel Tarde, to develop conceptual tools that track the sleepwalker through what Sampson calls the 'dark refrain of social media'. This is a refrain that spreads through viral platform architectures with a staccato-like repetition of shock events, rumours, conspiracy, misinformation, big lies, search engine weaponization, data voids, populist strongmen, immune system failures, and far-right hate speech. In A Sleepwalker's Guide, the sleepwalker is not positioned as a pre-programmed smartphone junkie, but is presented as a conceptual personae intended to dodge capture by data doubles and lookalikes. Sleepwalkers are neither asleep nor wide awake; they are a liminal experimentation in collective mimicry and self-other relationality. Their purpose is to stir up a new kind of community that emerges from the potentialities of revolutionary contagion.

The A&SM conferences in east London are an annual interdisciplinary event that brings together internationally renowned researchers, postgraduate students and artists interested in the nonconscious, emotional, affective and feely aspects of social media interaction. A&SM also hosts the Senorium art show curated by the artists Mikey Georgeson and Dean Todd.

== Community engagement activism ==
Sampson is a co-founder of the Cultural Engine Research Group (CERG), formerly known as Club Critical Theory (CCT). CERG is an activist group working with economically marginalized communities to mobilize critical theory as a kind of ecology of praxis or what Gilles Deleuze calls "the action of praxis, in the relations of relays and networks." The initial aim of CCT was to move critical theory into "informal spaces outside of the university [pay]walls." The project sought to undermine the "introspective character of much scholarly activity and changing nature of the "public" university model." CERG is currently based at the University of East London and publishes a blog that sets out the group's community engagement agenda, listing the various free events they organize mainly in London and the South East of England.

== Media coverage ==
Interviewed in the wake of the Cambridge Analytica scandal by the Colombian newspaper El Espectador in 2018 Sampson discussed the political nature of memes making the point that "Recent events have shown that the right wing has powerful contagious moods that help spread their ideas... Education has to be central on a global scale, but there must also be new ideas that can infect the mood of a population so that it can empower itself instead of becoming docile to hate messages."

Sampson's work on the emotional manipulations of message apps and social media notifications has also been reported on in the Czech media (Ceska Televize) and Dazed magazine where he argued that social media "trigger often negative emotions linked to compulsive behaviour so as to keep people checking their social media page or using an app, not only to see if we have a response but to see if our message has even been read or not.. The more compulsive the checking of notifications and read receipts becomes, the more they keep the data flow alive and the more likely we are to keep giving away more information about ourselves that can be sold on."

Sampson's Virality is also referenced in the Mashable video "Virality: How Does It Work and Why Do We Share?". In this introductory video presenter Armand Valdes explains how the theories used in Sampson's thesis help support the idea that virality has increased because of the rise of the network society. Again in a Mashable article published in 2016 called "How apps like Peach go viral" Sampson discusses why he considers accidents in the environment as more important to virality than content. "If the physical environment or mood atmosphere is right," he argues, "then things might spread. All you can do is prime the environment, create a mood, and just maybe, the accident will happen,"

More recently, Sampson's work on contagion theory has been referred to in press coverage of the new coronavirus outbreak in 2020. In an interview with Sampson in March 2020, Bloomberg journalist, Alex Webb, draws attention to his sleepwalker contagion theory to point to 'a strand of social thought... which looks at how ideas, and at times irrational behavior, are spread in a group.' As Webb puts it, following Sampson's work, social media can be grasped as playing on [collective behaviour] by generating emotional reactions to content.' Herein Webb uses the example of Facebook, which invites users to 'respond to a post with a like, love, anger, amazement, laughter or crying emoji. All emotions you broadcast out to an array of people near and far, encouraging them to do the same.' Along these Lines, the article acknowledges how the Sleepwalker thesis presents social media as 'wired' to 'stir up emotional engagements and make them contagious.' These contagions can be 'detrimental to a whole range of things from politics to health [since] what spreads tends to be on a rapid visceral register of communication rather than reasoned thinking.'

== Selected bibliography ==
=== Books ===
- Tony D Sampson, A Sleepwalker's Guide to Social Media, Polity, 2020. ISBN 978-1509537402
- Tony D Sampson, Darren Ellis and Stephen Maddison (eds.) Affect and Social Media: Emotion, Mediation, Anxiety and Contagion, Rowman and Littlefield International, July 2018. ISBN 978-1-78660-439-2
- Rizosfera: Digital Neuroland. An Interview with Tony D. Sampson (Creative Commons, Rhizonomics – RZN002, 2017) in English and Italian, 2018.
- Tony D Sampson, The Assemblage Brain: Sense Making in Neuroculture, University of Minnesota Press, Dec, 2016. ISBN 978-1-5179-0117-2
- Tony D Sampson, Virality: Contagion Theory in the Age of Networks, University of Minnesota Press, 2012. ISBN 978-0816670055
- Jussi Parikka and Tony D Sampson (eds.) The Spam Book: On Viruses, Porn and Other Anomalies from the Dark Side of Digital Culture, Cresskill, New Jersey: Hampton Press, 2009. ISBN 9781572739161

=== Selected peer reviewed journal articles ===
- "Unthought Meets the Assemblage Brain: A Dialogue between N. Katherine Hayles and Tony D. Sampson." Capacious Journal 1(2) (June, 2018).
- "Transitions in HCI: From the Information Society to Experience Capitalism" special issue of AI and Society (2018).
- "Cosmic Ecologies of Imitation: From the Horror of Digital Autotoxicus to the Auto-Toxicity of the Social" special issue of Parallax, Volume 23, 2017 – Issue 1: Autoimmunities, Guest Edited by Stefan Herbrechter and Michelle Jamieson.
- "Various Joyful Encounters with the Dystopias of Affective Capitalism" special issue of Ephemera, 16/4, 2016.
- Hungarian Translation of "Contagion Theory Beyond the Microbe" "Fertőzéselmélet a mikrobákon túl", Apertúra, Autumn(1), 2016.
- "An Interview with Tony D Sampson" NANO special issue on Originality in Digital Culture, Dec 2016.
- "Getting the [Care] Deficit Down" A review of Michael Schillmeier's Eventful Bodies: The Cosmopolitics of Illness in New Formations Issue 84(5), 2015.
- Commentary for a special section on 'contagion', Journal of Public Health, Oxford University Press, August 21, 2013.
- Review of Immaterial Bodies: Affect, Embodiment, Mediation by Lisa Blackman in New Formations Issue 79-79 Touches, Traces, and Times, 2013.
- "Tarde's Phantom Takes a Deadly Line of Flight," special issue (Operations of the Global – Explorations of Dis/Connectivity) Distinktion Journal, 2012.
- "Contagion Theory Beyond the Microbe," special Issue (In the Name of Security) in CTheory Journal of Theory, Technology and Culture, Jan, 2011.
- With Jairo Lugo-Ocando, "E-Informality in Venezuela: The Other Path to Technology," Bulletin of Latin American Research, (27)1, pp. 102–118; 2008.

=== Selected book chapters ===
- "Cosmic Topologies of Imitation: From the Horror of Digital Autotoxicus to the Auto-Toxicity of the Social," in Autoimmunities. Editors: by Stefan Herbrechter and Michelle Jamieson, Routledge, 2018.
- "Tap My Head and Mike My Brain: Neuromarketing and Addiction," in Are We All Addicts Now? Editors: Vanessa Bartlett and Henrietta Bowden-Jones, Liverpool University Press, 2017.
- "The Self-Other Topology: The Politics of [User] Experience in the Age of Social Media" in Boundaries of Self & Reality Online: Implications of Digitally Constructed Realities. Editor: Jayne Gackenbach, Elsevier, 2016.
- "Interview with Tony D. Sampson" in The Birth of Digital Populism. Crowd, Power and Postdemocracy in the 21st Century, Obsolete Capitalism Free Press, 2015.
- "Contagion Theory: Beyond the Microbe," Critical Digital Studies: A Reader, Arthur and Marilouise Kroker (eds.), University of Toronto Press, 2013.
- With Jussi Parikka, "Learning from Network Dysfunctionality: Accidents, Enterprise and Small Worlds of Infection" The Blackwell Companion to New Media Dynamics, Hartley, Burgess and Bruns (eds.), Wiley-Blackwell, 2012.
- "Error-Contagion: Network Hypnosis and Collective Culpability," Error: Glitch, Noise, and Jam in New Media Cultures, Mark Nunes (ed.), New York, London: Continuum, 2010.
- With Lugo and Lossanda, "A Prospective Analysis of the Video Games Industry in Latin America: From Banana Republic to Donkey Kong," FILE: Electronic Language International Festival 10 Years Commemorative Book, São Paulo, Brazil, 2010.
- With Jussi Parikka, "On Anomalous Objects: An Introduction," in The Spam Book: On Viruses, Porn and Other Anomalies From the Dark Side of Digital Culture, Parikka and Sampson (eds.), Cresskill, New Jersey: Hampton Press, pp. 1–18, 2009.
- "How Networks Become Viral: Three Questions Concerning Universal Contagion," in The Spam Book: On Viruses, Porn and Other Anomalies From the Dark Side of Digital Culture, Parikka and Sampson (eds.), Cresskill, New Jersey: Hampton Press, pp. 39–59; 2009.

=== Selected online publications ===
- "Neuropaesaggi digitali. Intervista a Tony D. Sampson – a cura di Rizosfera" in Effimera (Italian), 2018.
- "Brave New World: the pill-popping, social media obsessed dystopia we live in" in The Conversation, February 23, 2017. Translated in German for Netzpiloten Magazin
- "Barbican's Digital Exhibition is Nothing More Than Gimmickry", Review of Barbican Digital Revolution Exhibit in The Conversation, July 2014.
- "Crowds, Power and Post-Democracy in the 21st Century" an interview with Tony D. Sampson by Rizomatika, Obsolete Capitalism and Variazioni Foucaultiane blogs, 2013.
- "Tarde as Media Theorist": an interview with Tony D. Sampson, by Jussi Parikka on the Theory, Culture and Society blog, 2012.
- "Imitative Inventions", an online review of Olga Goriunova's Art Platforms and Cultural Production on the Internet, Mute Magazine, 2012.
- "Turning Software Inside Out: A Review of FLOSS +Art and Software Studies", Mute Magazine, 2009. Translated in Spanish: "Software de Arriba a Abajo", Tin Tank: Conocimieto Inspiracion e Ideas ahora, 2010.

== See also ==
- Affect (philosophy) – Philosophy concept by Baruch Spinoza
- Affect theory – Theory that seeks to organize subjective feelings into discrete categories
- Collective behavior – Sociological theory
- Emotional contagion – Spontaneous spread of emotions among a group
- Gabriel Tarde – French sociologist
- Mikey Georgeson – English artist
- Viral phenomenon – Self-replicating objects or patterns
