= Pirkko Moisala =

Finnish ethnomusicologist (born 1953)

- Born: 14 November 1953 (age 72); Taivalkoski, Northern Ostrobothnia, Finland
- Education: University of Turku; University of Helsinki
- Employer(s): Åbo Akademi University; University of Turku; University of Helsinki; Ethnomusicology; Royal Journal of Musicology; Women and Music
- Organization(s): International Council for Traditional Music; The Finnish Society of Ethnomusicology
- Notable work: Music and Gender (2000); Kaija Saariaho (2009)

Pirkko Moisala (born 14 November 1953) is a Finnish ethnomusicologist, writer and educator. She leads the research project Indigenous Musics and Well-Being at the University of Helsinki, founded the International Council for Traditional Music and is vice-chair of Finland's Society for Ethnomusicology. She is known for her research on Finnish composer Kaija Saariaho and for co-editing Music and Gender.

== Career ==
Moisala studied at the University of Helsinki and University of Turku (UTU). She has worked at Åbo Akademi University and the University of Turku. She is professor emerita of Musicology and Ethnomusicology at the University of Helsinki. She leads the research project Indigenous Musics and Well-Being, which "studies music as a tool for ethnic empowerment, social cohesion, and cultural sustainability."

Moisala is a member of the editorial boards of the scholarly journals Ethnomusicology, Royal Journal of Musicology and Women and Music. She founded the International Council for Traditional Music (ICTM) and is vice-chair of The Finnish Society of Ethnomusicology .

== Selected publications ==
- Cultural Cognition in Music: Continuity and Change in the Gurung Music of Nepal (1991, Gummerus Kirjapaino Oy)
- Kansanmusiikin tutkimus: Metodologian opas (1991)
- Music and Gender (co-edited with Beverley Diamond, 2000, University of Illinois Press)
- "Nepal" in The Garland Encyclopedia of World Music: South Asia: The Indian Subcontinent
- Kaija Saariaho, Women Composers Series, 1 (2009, University of Illinois Press)
- Musical Encounters with Deleuze and Guattari (edited with Taru Leppänen, Milla Tiainen and Hanna Väätäinen, 2017, Bloomsbury Academic)
