= Etienne Benson =

American academic

- Education: Massachusetts Institute of Technology; Stanford University; Harvard University
- Scientific career
- Workplaces: Max Planck Institute for the History of Science
- Website: www.mpiwg-berlin.mpg.de/de/people/ebenson

Etienne S. Benson (born 1976) is a historian specializing in the intersections of science, politics, and the environment, with a focus on the United States and Europe from the eighteenth century to the present. Together with Dagmar Schäfer, he currently serves as a Director at the Max Planck Institute for the History of Science in Berlin. His department "Knowledge Systems and Collective Life" examines the interplay between knowledge systems, political structures, and societal dynamics, focusing on how knowledge shapes collective decision-making and governance, particularly in the context of environmental challenges and sustainability.

Benson earned his Ph.D. from the Massachusetts Institute of Technology (MIT) in 2008 and has held academic positions at institutions such as Harvard University, the University of Pennsylvania, and the University of Chicago (Wolf Humanities Center). Prior to that, he received an AB in cognitive neuroscience from Harvard College in 1999 and an MA in psychology from Stanford University in 2001.

He is the author of Wired Wilderness: Technologies of Tracking and the Making of Modern Wildlife, Johns Hopkins University Press, (2010) and Surroundings: A History of Environments and Environmentalisms (2020), which examine the intersections of technology, environmentalism, and wildlife conservation.

He serves on the advisory boards of several committees and journals, including The Journal of the History of Biology and Osiris, and is a member of the executive council of the Society for the History of Technology (SHOT). Through his interdisciplinary scholarship published in various academic journals and through his public engagement, Benson has made significant contributions in exploring human-animal relations, conservation history, environmentalism, and the development of Earth and environmental sciences
