= Hans-Jörg Rheinberger =

Liechtenstein historian (born 1946)

- Born: 12 January 1946 (age 80); Grabs, Switzerland
- Occupation: Historian
- Known for: History of epistemic things

Hans-Jörg Rheinberger (Swiss Standard German: [ˈraɪnbɛrɡər]; born 12 January 1946) is a Swiss-born Liechtensteiner historian of science. He was director of the Max Planck Institute for the History of Science in Berlin from 1997 to 2014. His focus areas within the history of science are the history and epistemology of the experiment, and further the history of molecular biology and protein biosynthesis. Additionally, he writes and publicizes essays and poems.

== Life ==
Hans-Jörg Rheinberger was born in Grabs, Switzerland, on 12 January 1946. He is the great-grandnephew of the composer Josef Rheinberger and grandchild of the artist and architect Egon Rheinberger. He studied philosophy, linguistics and biology at the University of Tübingen, the Free University of Berlin and Technische Universität Berlin. After completing his magister degree in philosophy (1973) he earned his doctorate (Dr. rer. nat.) in 1982 with a dissertation concerned with protein biosynthesis and habilitated 1987 in molecular biology at the FU Berlin. From 1982 until 1990 Rheinberger worked as research assistant and research group superintendent at the Max Planck Institute for Molecular Genetics in Berlin-Dahlem. The following two years he spent as visiting professor at the universities of Salzburg and Innsbruck. After a sabbatical at Stanford University (1989/90 within the program "History of Science"), he was a senior lecturer at the Institute for the History of Medicine and Science of the University of Lübeck from 1990 until 1994. Subsequently, Rheinberger was associate professor at the University of Salzburg until 1996.

Since 1996 Rheinberger is a scientific member of the Max Planck Society and has been director at the Max Planck Institute for the History of Science from 1997 until 2014. Since then, he is Emeritus scientific member of the institute. From 1993 until 1994 he was a fellow at the Berlin Institute for Advanced Study. In 2000 Rheinberger taught in the capacity of visiting scholar at the Collegium Helveticum of the Swiss Federal Institute of Technology in Zurich, 2006 at the Johns Hopkins University in Baltimore and 2016 at the Northwestern University in Evanston. He is an honorary professor at TU Berlin, member of the Berlin-Brandenburg Academy of Sciences and Humanities, the Academy of Sciences Leopoldina, as well as the P.E.N.-Club Liechtenstein. In the Spring of 2017, Reinberger was a Residential Fellow at the Swedish Collegium for Advanced Study in Uppsala, Sweden.

== Research ==
Rheinberger's primary field of activity within the history of science is the epistemological exploration of the experiment and of the research practices of the natural sciences, with focus on the biology of the 19th and 20th century. In his studies he describes "experimental systems" to be the driving forces within the development of the modern natural sciences. He developed his corpus of theoretical categories in dependence to the philosophy of Jacques Derrida and draws many inspirations from the works of Gaston Bachelard.

His main focus is aimed at the "structures of the experiment", which he deciphers by applying reconstructive analysis to the work in laboratories concerned with biological research. In contrast to the common self-image the researching science themselves hold, Rheinberger shows that planning and control is less defining the every-day-business of research than improvisation and chance. According to Rheinberger promising "experimental systems" are distinguished by the amount of space they grant an "epistemic thing" to unfold itself. This is, as he puts it, imperative to "deal prodictively the unknown".

== The "epistemic thing" ==
The "epistemic thing" is the object of investigation during the research process, which can develop to become a "technical object" over the course of the investigation, therefore becoming something that can be used to research other "epistemic things". The boundary between "epistemic thing" and "technical object" is not static and identifying something as either or not permanent. Therefore, insight is neither inevitable nor complete. Rheinberger's experiences as a molecular biologist has brought the "materiality of the natural sciences" into the focus of the history of science.

== Awards and distinctions ==
- 1998: Honorary Professor at the Technischen Universität Berlin
- 2006: Honorary doctorate at the ETH Zürich
- 2006: cogito-award
- 2012: Distinguished Lecture der History of Science Society (HSS)
- 2014: Marsilius Lecture und Medaille des Marsilius-Kollegs an der Universität Heidelberg

== Selected publications ==
Monographies

- Experiment, Differenz, Schrift. Zur Geschichte epistemischer Dinge. Basilisken-Presse, Marburg/Lahn 1992, ISBN 3-925347-20-8.
- Experimentalsysteme und epistemische Dinge. Eine Geschichte der Proteinsynthese im Reagenzglas.
  - original edition: Toward a History of Epistemic Things. Stanford Univ. Press, 1997, ISBN 978-0-8047-2786-0.
  - Wallstein-Verlag, Göttingen 2001, ISBN 3-89244-454-4.
  - Suhrkamp-Taschenbuch Wissenschaft. Bd. 1806, Suhrkamp, 2006, ISBN 978-3-518-29406-2.
- Iterationen (= Internationaler Merve-Diskurs. Bd. 271). Merve-Verlag, Berlin 2005, ISBN 3-88396-205-8.
- Epistemologie des Konkreten. Studien zur Geschichte der modernen Biologie (= Suhrkamp-Taschenbuch Wissenschaft. Bd. 1771). Suhrkamp, Frankfurt am Main 2006, ISBN 3-518-29371-0.
- Historische Epistemologie zur Einführung (= Zur Einführung. Bd. 336). Junius, Hamburg 2007, ISBN 978-3-88506-636-1.
- On Historicizing Epistemology: An Essay. Stanford University Press, Stanford 2010, ISBN 978-0804762892.
- An Epistemology of the Concrete: Twentieth-century Histories of Life. Duke University Press, Durham 2010, ISBN 978-0822345756.
- Introduction à la philosophie des sciences. Editions La Découverte, Paris 2014, ISBN 978-2707178244.
- Rekurrenzen. Texte zu Althusser. Merve, Berlin 2014, ISBN 978-3883963556.
- Natur und Kultur im Spiegel des Wissens: Marsilius-Vorlesung am 6. Februar 2014. Universitätsverlag Winter, Heidelberg 2015, ISBN 978-3825364397.
- Die Farben des Tastens. Edition Faust, Frankfurt am Main 2015, ISBN 978-3945400234.
- Der Kupferstecher und der Philosoph. Diaphanes, Zürich und Berlin 2016, ISBN 978-3037346211.
- mit Staffan Müller-Wille:
  - Vererbung. Geschichte und Kultur eines biologischen Konzepts. Fischer-Taschenbuch-Verlag, Frankfurt am Main 2009, ISBN 978-3-596-17063-0.
  - Das Gen im Zeitalter der Postgenomik. Eine wissenschaftshistorische Bestandsaufnahme. Suhrkamp, Frankfurt am Main 2009, ISBN 978-3518260258
  - A Cultural History of Heredity. University of Chicago Press, Chicago 2012, ISBN 978-0226213484.

Editor

- with Michael Hagner: Die Experimentalisierung des Lebens. Experimentalsysteme in den biologischen Wissenschaften 1850/1950. Akademie-Verlag, Berlin 1993, ISBN 3-05-002307-4.
- with Michael Hagner, Bettina Schmidt-Wahrig: Räume des Wissens. Repräsentation, Codierung, Spur. Akademie-Verlag, Berlin 1997, ISBN 3-05-002781-9.

Papers

- Alles, was überhaupt zu einer Inskription führen kann. In: Norbert Haas, Rainer Nägele, Hans-Jörg Rheinberger (Hrsg.): Im Zug der Schrift. Fink, München 1994, ISBN 3-7705-2946-4, S. 295–309.
- Experimental Systems – Graphematic Spaces. In: Timothy Lenoir (Hrsg.): Inscribing Science. Scientific Texts and the Materiality of Communication. Stanford University Press, Stanford CA 1998, ISBN 0-8047-2777-5, S. 285–303.
- Vignette für W. H. In: Aris Fioretos (Hrsg.): Babel. Für Werner Hamacher. Urs Engeler, Basel 2009, ISBN 3-938767-55-3, S. 314f.

=== Translations ===
- Jacques Derrida: Grammatologie (= Suhrkamp-Taschenbuch Wissenschaft. Bd. 417). Übersetzt von Hans-Jörg Rheinberger und Hanns Zischler. Suhrkamp, Frankfurt am Main 1983, ISBN 3-518-28017-1 (Originalausgabe: De la Grammatologie. Éditions de Minuit, Paris 1967).

=== Festschrift ===
- Eine Naturgeschichte für das 21. Jahrhundert: Hommage à Hans-Jörg Rheinberger. Herausgegeben von der Abteilung III des Max-Planck-Instituts für Wissenschaftsgeschichte, Berlin. Alpheus-Verlag, Berlin 2014, ISBN 978-3-9813184-5-6.
