= TDR (journal) =

TDR: The Drama Review
- Discipline: Arts
- Language: English
- Edited by: Rebecca Schneider, William Huizhu Sun

Publication details
- History: 1955-present
- Publisher: Cambridge University Press (UK)
- Frequency: Quarterly

Standard abbreviations
- ISO 4: TDR

Indexing
- ISSN: 1054-2043 (print); 1531-4715 (web)
- JSTOR: 10542043
- OCLC no.: 50670623

Links
- Journal homepage; Project MUSE; TDR at NYU Tisch

TDR: The Drama Review is an academic journal focusing on performances in their social, economic, aesthetic, and political contexts. The journal covers dance, theatre, music, performance art, visual art, popular entertainment, media, sports, rituals, and performance in politics and everyday life.

TDR: The Drama Review was founded in 1955 by Robert W. Corrigan as the "Carleton Drama Review" (so named because Corrigan was a faculty member at Carleton College). Corrigan took TDR with him to Tulane University in 1957 where he renamed it the Tulane Drama Review. In 1962, Corrigan left Tulane for Carnegie Mellon University and Richard Schechner became editor. Schechner left Tulane for New York University in 1967 taking TDR with him and renaming it TDR: The Drama Review. Erika Munk succeeded Schechner as editor in 1969. Michael Kirby became editor in 1970. In 1986, Kirby resigned and Schechner resumed TDR's editorship. Schechner continues as editor as of 2021. TDR is owned by New York University and is published in hard copy and online by Cambridge University Press.

From 2011 onwards, TDR's point of view was expanded by means of a consortium of editors: Tavia Nyong'o, Kimberly Jannarone, and Elise Morrison (Yale University), Rebecca Schneider (Brown University), William (Huizhu) Sun (Shanghai Theatre Academy), and Branislav Jakovljevic (Stanford University). From 2011 until 2017, Jill Dolan and Stacy Wolf (Princeton University) were members of the TDR Consortium. Within the Consortium, Schechner continues as editor-in-chief, Mariellen Sandford, continue as associate editor, and Sara Brady as managing editor. One issue a year is edited by a Consortium editor or editors.

TDR is not peer-reviewed, a fact that has been somewhat controversial. However, submissions to TDR are often sent by Schechner for evaluation to one or more of TDR's Contributing Editors, an international group of distinguished scholars and artists. In his article "TDR and Me," Schechner called the objectivity that is associated with the process of peer review "a chimera". Expanding on this, he explained: "The opinion of a group remains subjective. In the humanities, too often peer review leads to the publication of articles that support whatever notions are popular/stylish at the time".

As of 2021, TDR is published by Cambridge University Press.
