= Minna Tarkka =

Finnish critic (1960–2023)

Minna Tarkka (25 December 1960– 27 August 2023) was a Finnish critic, educator, producer and curator of media art and culture. In 2000 she co-founded m-cult in Helsinki, Finland and remained as its director until 2023.

== Life and work ==
Tarkka was active in developing the first media art-related university courses in Finland, including the Faculty of Time and Space (Academy of Fine Arts) and the MA in New Media (University of Art and Design, Media Lab). She was a founder member and the first director of MUU (1989–91), as well as a founding member of AV-arkki, a distribution facility for media art, and the Finnish Media Art Network.

ISEA, the International Symposium on Electronic Art, was held in Helsinki under Tarkka's direction in 1994 in partnership with the University of Art and Design, and again in 2004, where it took place both in Helsinki and in Tallinn, Estonia, and was produced by curator Amanda McDonald Crowley.

In 2017, Tarkka was awarded the Finnish State Art Prize in Media Art category acknowledging her pioneering work and her commissions in collaborative new media art.

Tarkka died on 27 August 2023, at the age of 62.
