= Beverley Diamond =

Canadian pianist and feminist ethnomusicologist (born 1948)

Beverley Diamond CM
- Born: 4 June 1948 (age 78); Kitchener, Ontario, Canada
- Education: University of Toronto
- Occupations: Pianist and feminist ethnomusicologist
- Employer(s): McGill University; Queen's University at Kingston; University of Toronto; York University; Memorial University of Newfoundland
- Organization(s): Royal Society of Canada; Society for Ethnomusicology; International Council for Traditional Music; Society for American Music
- Notable work: Music and Gender (2000)
- Awards: Member of the Order of Canada; Gold medal of the Social Sciences and Humanities Research Council of Canada (SSHRC)

Beverley Anne Diamond CM (née Cavanagh, born 4 June 1948) is a Canadian pianist and feminist ethnomusicologist.

== Biography ==
Diamond was born on 4 June 1948 in Kitchener, Ontario, Canada.

Diamond studied piano under Clifford Poole and her PhD at the University of Toronto, graduating in 1978.

Diamond has taught at McGill University (1973 to 1975), Queen's University at Kingston (1975 to 1988), the University of Toronto, (1980 to 1981), York University (1988 to 2002), and Memorial University of Newfoundland (from 2002). At York University, she was Associate Professor of Music, Associate Dean of Fine Arts and Director of the Graduate Program in Music. She was a visiting professor at Harvard University in 1999.

Diamond specialises in researching the indigenous musical cultures of Canada and Scandinavia, such as Inuit and First Nations conventional and improvised song traditions, Algonkian Christian hymns, musical instruments in Native communities, and Lapland's Sámi joik form of song. She has also studied the musical practices associated with Albanian weddings in the Prespa region and music in Pacific Islands cultures.

Diamond contributed to the Encyclopedia of Music in Canada. She co-edited Music and Gender (2000) with Finnish ethnomusicologist Pirkko Moisala.

Diamond has served on the boards of the Society for Ethnomusicology and the International Council for Traditional Music and is an honorary member of the Society for American Music. She was elected as a Fellow of the Royal Society of Canada (RSC) in 2008, was named a Fellow of the Trudeau Foundation in 2009 and was appointed as a Member of the Order of Canada in 2012. She received the Gold Medal of the Social Sciences and Humanities Research Council of Canada (SSHRC) in 2014.
