= Paul Schneider (author) =

American writer (born 1962)

Paul Schneider (born 1962) is an American author of non-fiction books and magazine articles.

Paul Schneider was raised in Amherst, Massachusetts. The son of Peter and Pat Schneider, he graduated from Brown University in 1984. He has contributed to periodicals including The New York Times, O, The Oprah Magazine, Audubon, Elle, Esquire, The New Yorker, and Mirabella. He lives in West Tisbury, Massachusetts.

== Works ==
- The Adirondacks: A History of America's First Wilderness, Henry Holt, 1997. (A New York Times Notable Book of the Year)
- The Enduring Shore: A History of Cape Cod, Martha's Vineyard, and Nantucket, Henry Holt, 2000. ISBN 0-8050-5928-8. (Selected by the Cape Cod Times as one of the 20 best books on Cape Cod.)
- The Enduring Shore: A History of Cape Cod, Martha's Vineyard, and Nantucket, Paperback Edition 2001. ISBN 0-8050-6734-5
- Brutal Journey: Cabeza de Vaca and the Epic Story of the First Crossing of North America. Henry Holt. 2006. ISBN 0-8050-6835-X
- Bonnie and Clyde: The Lives Behind the Legend, Henry Holt, 2009. ISBN 0-8050-8672-2
- Old Man River: The Mississippi River in North American History, 2013. ISBN 9780805091366
