= Milla Tiainen =

Finnish musicologist

Milla Tiainen (born 1975) is a Finnish musicologist specializing in cultural and gender studies of music and sound, voice studies, and musical performance studies. Dr. Tiainen is a senior lecturer in musicology at the University of Turku and an associate professor of musicology (docent) at the University of Helsinki. Tiainen obtained her Ph.D. in 2012. Before joining the Faculty of Humanities at the University of Turku, she worked as a senior lecturer at Anglia Ruskin University in the UK and the University of Helsinki in Finland.

In 2017-2020, she was co-editor in chief of Musiikki, the journal of the Finnish Musicological Society. She also chaired the Finnish Musicological Society in 2020–2023.

== Research ==
Tiainen’s research traverses the fields of contemporary ‘classical’ music culture, experimental and transdisciplinary art practices, and music and sound in the media. Her theoretical expertise spans new materialisms, posthumanisms, feminist and ecocritical theories, process ontologies and intersectionality studies. Tiainen was a founding member of the networking action “New Materialism: Networking European Scholarship on ‘How Matter Comes to Matter’” funded by COST: European Cooperation in Science and Technology (2014-2018). In 2010, she organized (with Jussi Parikka) the first international conference in the ongoing conference series on new materialisms.

In 2020-2021, Tiainen was a member of the European Research Council-funded project "SENSOTRA - Sensory Transformations and Transgenerational Environmental Relationships in Europe 1950-2020" led by sound studies and music scholar Professor Helmi Järviluoma.

Recently, Tiainen co-led, with art historian Katve-Kaisa Kontturi, the interdisciplinary project “New Economies of Artistic Labour” (2020-2024, Kone Foundation) which explored the multiple forms of artists’ work, income and everyday life and the socioeconomic difficulties they encounter in contemporary Finland.

== Publications ==
Tiainen’s research encompasses empirical, theoretical, and methodological perspectives on music, performance and contemporary art. She has published extensively on the materialities and cultural, social and political implications of music and sound. In her body of work, Tiainen has developed specific methodological approaches and new conceptual tools to grasp the materialities of musical sound, voice and the more-than-human participants of artistic practices.

In her co-edited book "New Materialism and Intersectionality: Making Middles Matter" (with Katve-Kaisa Kontturi, Taru Leppänen, Tara Mehrabi), the concept of “middling” is proposed as a conceptual tool to explore questions of identity, relationality and difference as linked to the cultural and socio-political issues of the 21st century. The book calls for new convergences of the theories of new materialism and posthumanism and intersectionality studies.
