= Dagmar Schäfer =

German sinologist and historian of science

Dagmar Schäfer is a German sinologist and historian of science. She is director of Department III, Artifacts, Action, Knowledge at the Max Planck Institute for the History of Science, Berlin. She is honorary professor for the history of technology, Technische Universität Berlin; adjunct professor, Institute of Sinology, Freie Universität, Berlin, and Tianjin University (2018–2021). She was previously a guest professor at the school of history and culture of science, Shanghai Jiao Tong University. She was also the director of the Centre for Chinese Studies and held the professorial chair of Chinese studies at the University of Manchester.

Schäfer received her doctorate from the University of Würzburg, and her habilitation in the history of science in China. She has worked and studied at Zhejiang University, Peking University, National Tsing Hua University, the University of Pennsylvania, and the University of Manchester.

She won the History of Science Society: Pfizer Award in 2012, and the Association for Asian Studies' Joseph Levenson Book Prize in 2013, for her 2011 book The Crafting of the 10,000 Things (University of Chicago Press). In 2014 she became a member of the German Academy of Sciences Leopoldina. She was awarded the Gottfried Wilhelm Leibniz Prize in 2020.

== Selected publications ==
- Schäfer, Dagmar (2011). The Crafting of the 10,000 things: Knowledge and Technology in Seventeenth-Century China. Chicago: The University of Chicago Press. ISBN 978-0-226-27280-1. OCLC 636567536.
- Sterckx, Roel; Siebert, Martina; Schäfer, Dagmar, eds. (8 December 2018). Animals through Chinese History. Cambridge University Press. doi:10.1017/9781108551571. hdl:21.11116/0000-0002-C51E-F. ISBN 978-1-108-55157-1. S2CID 135070196.
- Brentjes, Sonja; Schäfer, Dagmar (6 July 2020). "Visualizations of the Heavens Before 1700 as a Concern of the History of Science, Medicine and Technology". NTM Zeitschrift für Geschichte der Wissenschaften, Technik und Medizin. 28 (3). Springer Science and Business Media LLC: 295–304. doi:10.1007/s00048-020-00266-4. hdl:21.11116/0000-0006-C6B4-F. ISSN 0036-6978. PMID 32632462. S2CID 220389218.
- Most, Glenn W.; Schäfer, Dagmar; Saarela, Mårten Söderbom, eds. (2023). Plurilingualism in Traditional Eurasian Scholarship: Thinking in Many Tongues. Leiden: Brill. ISBN 978-90-04-46466-7.
- Schäfer, Dagmar; Mamidipudi, Annapurna; Buning, Marius, eds. (2023). Ownership of Knowledge: Beyond Intellectual Property. Cambridge, MA: MIT Press. ISBN 978-90-04-46466-7.
