= Laurel C. Schneider =

American theologian

- Occupation: Professor of Religious Studies at Vanderbilt University

Academic work
- Discipline: Theology
- Institutions: Colby College; North Central College; Chicago Theological Seminary; Vanderbilt University

Laurel C. Schneider is an American theologian and a professor of Religion and Culture as well as a professor of Religious Studies at Vanderbilt University. Schneider is known for her theological analysis of images of God in relation to questions of social justice and liberation.

Her work has contributed to the development of a theological framework, using concepts like multiplicity and polydoxy, as an alternative to orthodoxy and more traditional approaches to religious belief and theological reflection. Schneider's work focuses on collaborative models of thinking and publishing. She has worked as co-convener of the National Workgroup in Constructive Theology resulting in a co-written publication entitled Awake to the Moment: Introducing Constructive Theology. Her other areas of research are queer theory and Native American religious traditions.

== Academics ==
Schneider has served as a professor of Religious Studies and Philosophy at Colby College and North Central College, as Professor of Theology, Ethics and Culture at Chicago Theological Seminary, and currently as a Professor of Religion and Culture, and Religious Studies at Vanderbilt University. Schneider's research focuses on the intersectional relationship between theology, Native American religious traditions, race, sexuality, postcolonial and gender theories. One of Schneider's main theological proposals is the concept of a logic of multiplicity that works to move us beyond a binary thinking framed by a singularly correct ideology or theology. She identifies that a logic of oneness is dualistic and demands a separation of truth from falsehood and "God" from "not God". Differently, Schneider's logic of multiplicity results in "fluidity, porosity, a-centered relation, nomadic generativity, promiscuous love, and impossible exchange. Theologian, Patrick S. Cheng, notes that Schneider's logic of multiplicity is a creative example of how contemporary theologians have used queer theory to resist binary thinking."

Schneider serves as the co-chair of the national Workgroup in Constructive Theology where she works collaboratively with a group of theologians at the intersections of postcolonial theory, queer theory, race theory and feminist theory. She has served in the American Academy of Religion, for two terms, on the Committee for the Status of LGBTIQ Persons in the Profession.

== Works ==
=== Selected books ===
- Re-Imagining the Divine: Confronting the Backlash against Feminist Theology, (Cleveland: The Pilgrim Press, 1998).
- Beyond Monotheism: A Theology of Multiplicity, (London: Routledge, 2007).
- Polydoxy: Theology of Multiplicity and Relation, Edited with Catherine Keller, (London: Routledge, 2010).
- Awake to the Moment: Introducing Constructive Theology, co-written with the Workgroup in Constructive Theology, co-edited with Stephen G. Ray, (Louisville: Westminster/John Knox Press).

=== Selected essays ===
- "The Courage to See and to Sin: Mary Daly's Elemental Transformation of Paul Tillich's Ontology" in Re-Reading the Canon: Feminist Interpretations of Mary Daly. Edited by Marily Frye and Sarah Lucia Hoagland. Philadelphia: Pennsylvania State University Press, 2000.
- "What Race is Your Sex?" in Queer Religion: LGBT Movements and Queering Religion, Volume II, ed. by Donald L Boisvert and Jay Emerson Johnson (Santa Barbara, CA, 2012). Reprinted from Harvey, Case & Gorsline (2005).
- "Homosexuality, Queer Theory and Christian Theology" in Men and Masculinities in Christianity and Judaism: A Critical Reader, ed. by Björn Krondorfer (SCM-Canterbury, 2009).
- "Promiscuous Incarnation: in The Embrace of Eros: Bodies, Desires, and Sexuality in Christianity, ed. by Margaret Kamitsuka (Minneapolis: Fortress, 2010).
- "The Gravity of Love: Theopoetics and Ontological Imagination" in Theoretic Folds" Philosophizing Multifariousness. Edited by Roland Faber and Jeremy Fackenthal. New York: Fordham University Press, 2013.
- "When the World is Alive, Spirit is Not Dismembered: Reflections on Native North American (Eastern Woodland) Philosophy" in Sensational Religion: Sense and Contention in Material Practice. Edited by Sally Promey. New Haven: Yale University Press, 2013.
