= Bethany J. Walker =

American archaeologist

- Education: University of Chicago, University of Toronto
- Known for: Islamic archaeology in Jordan and the Levant
- Scientific career
- Fields: Archaeology, Islamic history
- Workplaces: University of Bonn

Bethany J. Walker is an American archaeologist specializing in the archaeology of Islamic periods in the Levant and Middle East. She is a professor of Islamic Archaeology and Art History at the University of Bonn and one of the leading international scholars in the field of Islamic archaeology. Her interdisciplinary research integrates material culture, historical texts, and environmental data to explore the social, political, and economic history of Islamic societies.

== Education and academic career ==
Walker studied Middle Eastern studies and history at the University of Toronto, and earned her Ph.D. in Near Eastern Languages and Civilizations at the University of Chicago. Prior to her appointment at the University of Bonn, she held academic positions at Missouri State University and the University of Central Florida.

== Publications ==
Walker has published extensively on Islamic archaeology, rural settlement, and socio-economic history in the Islamic world. She has authored and co-edited several academic volumes and special journal issues, and contributed chapters to edited collections on Islamic history and archaeology.

Selected works include:

- Walker, B. J. (2009). Reflections on the Archaeology of the Mamluk Period in Jordan. *Annual of the Department of Antiquities of Jordan*.
- Walker, B. J. (Ed.) (2012). *Reflections of Empire: Archaeological and Ethnographic Studies on the Mutawakkilite Kingdom of Yemen*.
- Walker, B. J. and Kh. al-Shqour (2022). *The Late Islamic Landscape of Hisban: Village Life, Agricultural Economies, and Water Management*. Bonn: University of Bonn Press.

== Professional affiliations ==
Walker is an active member of numerous professional organizations, including:

- Council for British Research in the Levant (CBRL)
- American Schools of Oriental Research (ASOR)
- Deutsches Archäologisches Institut (DAI)

She frequently collaborates with international research teams and regional heritage institutions in Jordan and beyond.

== See also ==
- Islamic archaeology
- Tall Hisban
